= 2022 in New Zealand =

- Decades: 2000s; 2010s; 2020s
- See also: History of New Zealand; List of years in New Zealand; Timeline of New Zealand history

The following lists events that happened during 2022 in New Zealand.

== Incumbents ==
=== Regal and vice-regal ===
- Head of State – Elizabeth II until 8 September, then Charles III
- Governor-General – Cindy Kiro
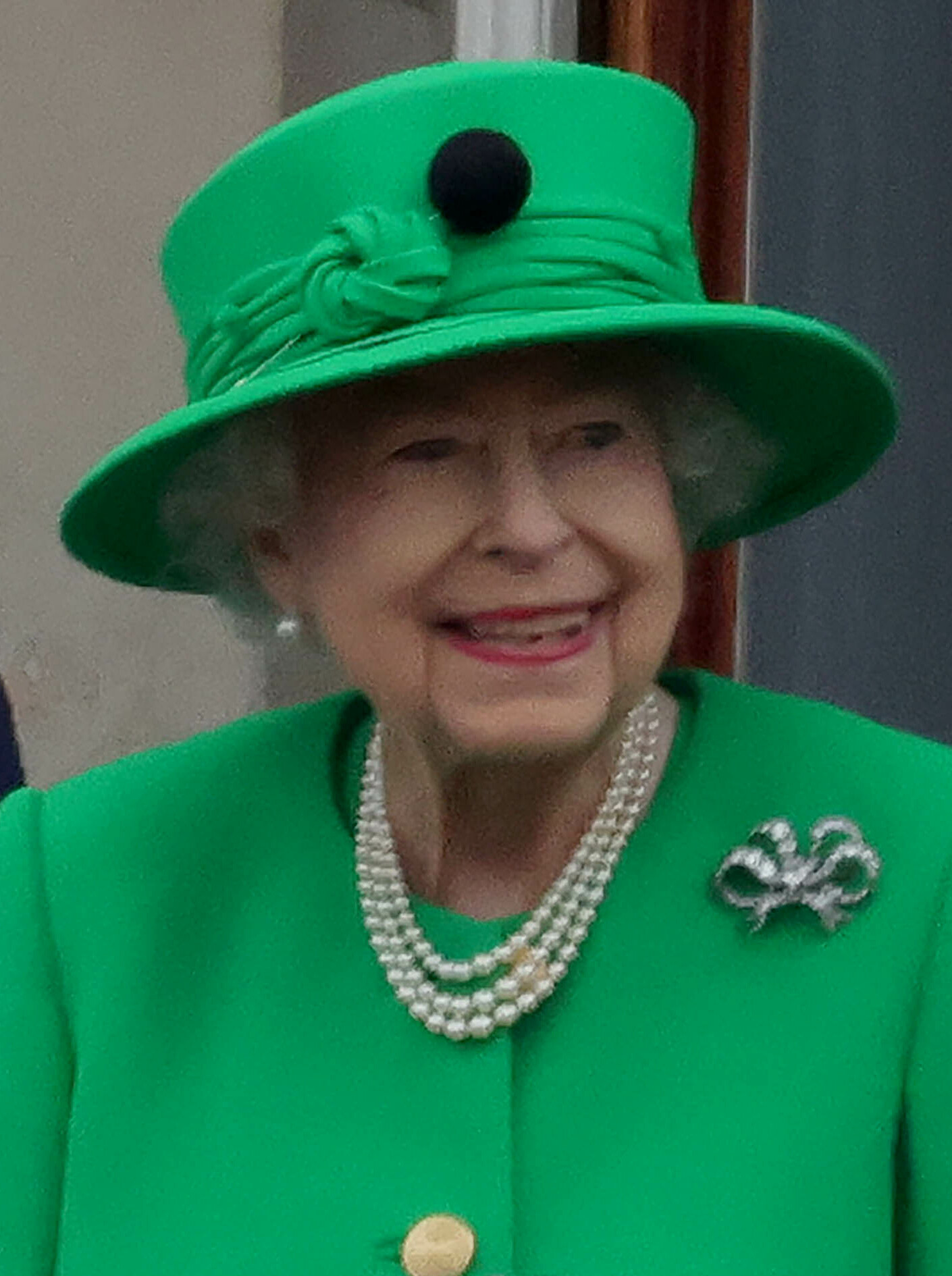
Elizabeth II

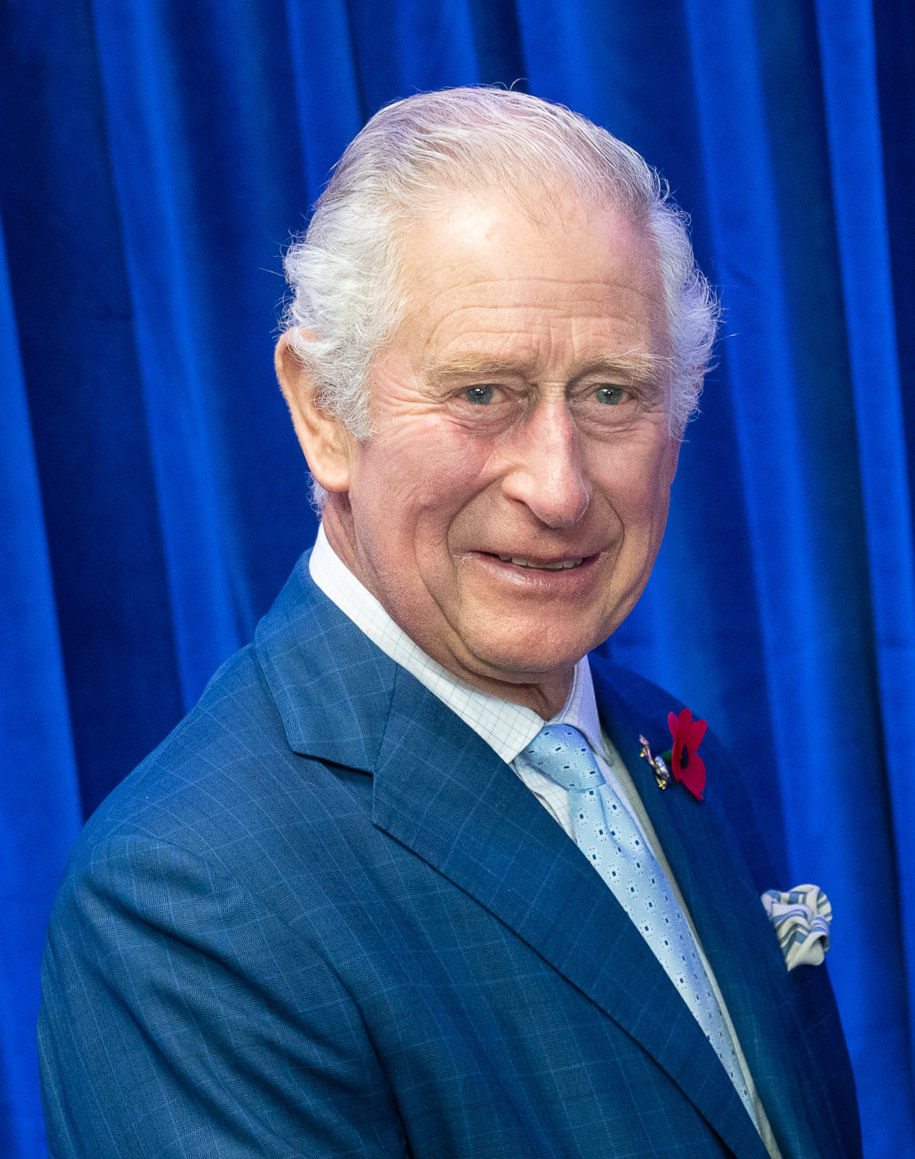
Charles III

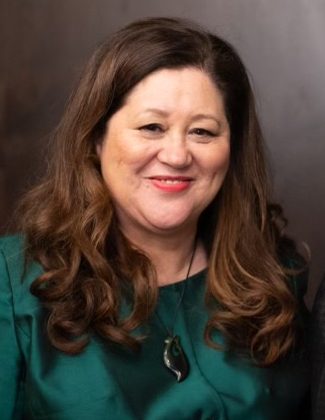
Cindy Kiro

=== Government ===
Legislature term: 53rd New Zealand Parliament

The Sixth Labour Government, elected in 2020, continues.

- Speaker of the House – Trevor Mallard until 24 August, then Adrian Rurawhe
- Prime Minister – Jacinda Ardern
- Deputy Prime Minister – Grant Robertson
- Leader of the House – Chris Hipkins
- Minister of Finance – Grant Robertson
- Minister of Foreign Affairs – Nanaia Mahuta
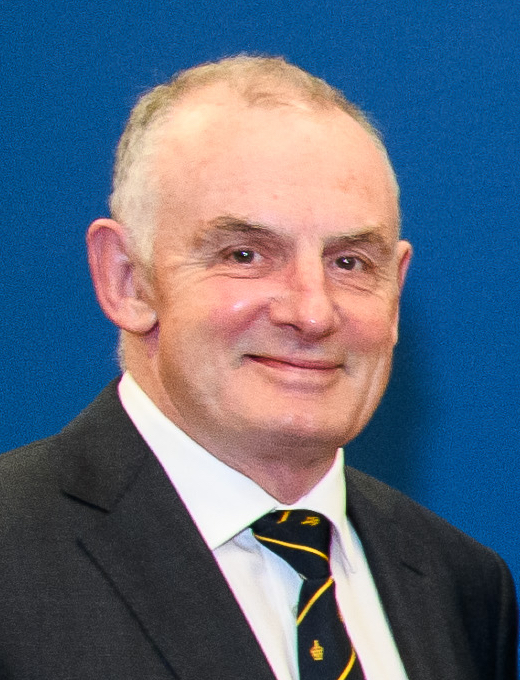
Trevor Mallard

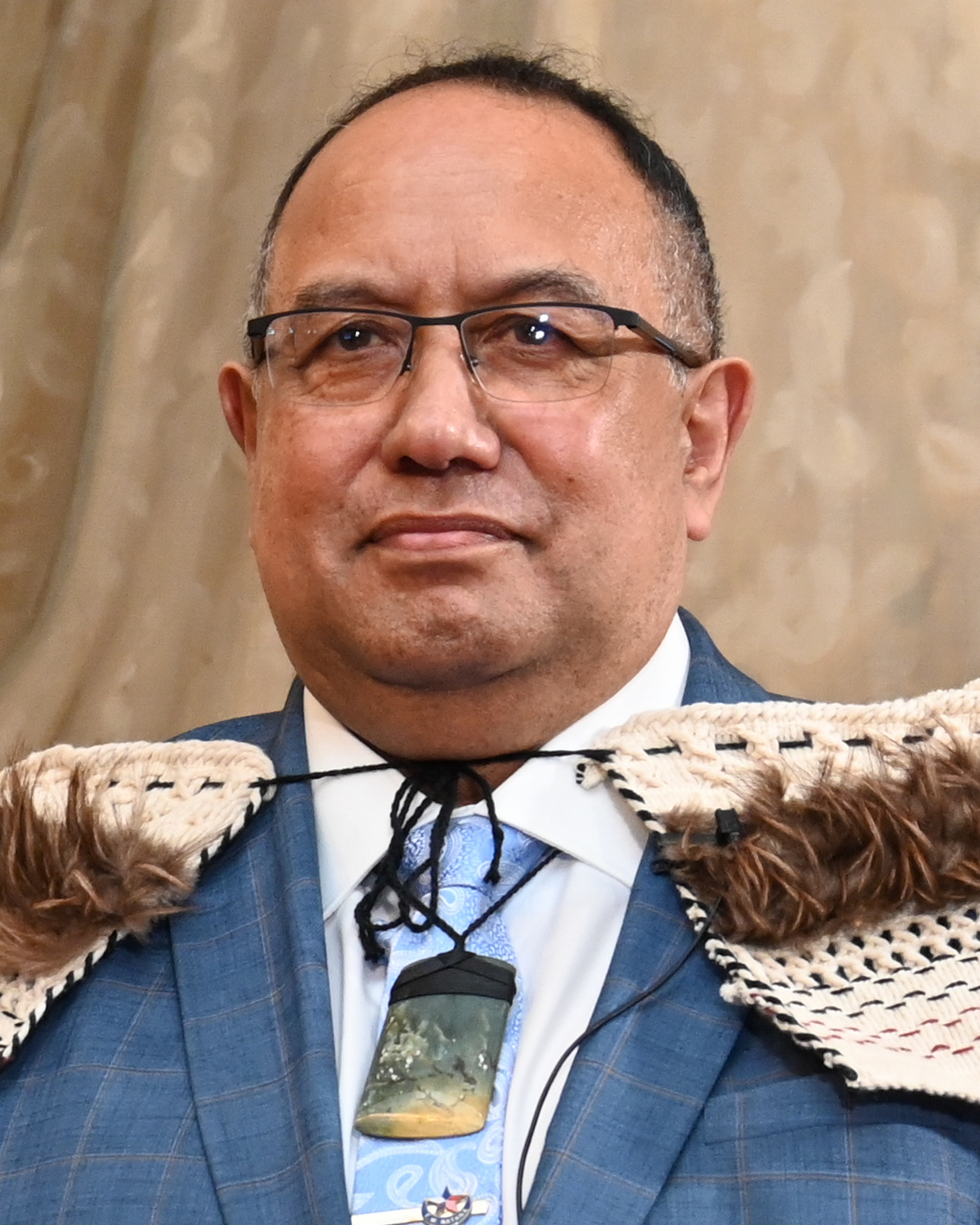
Adrian Rurawhe

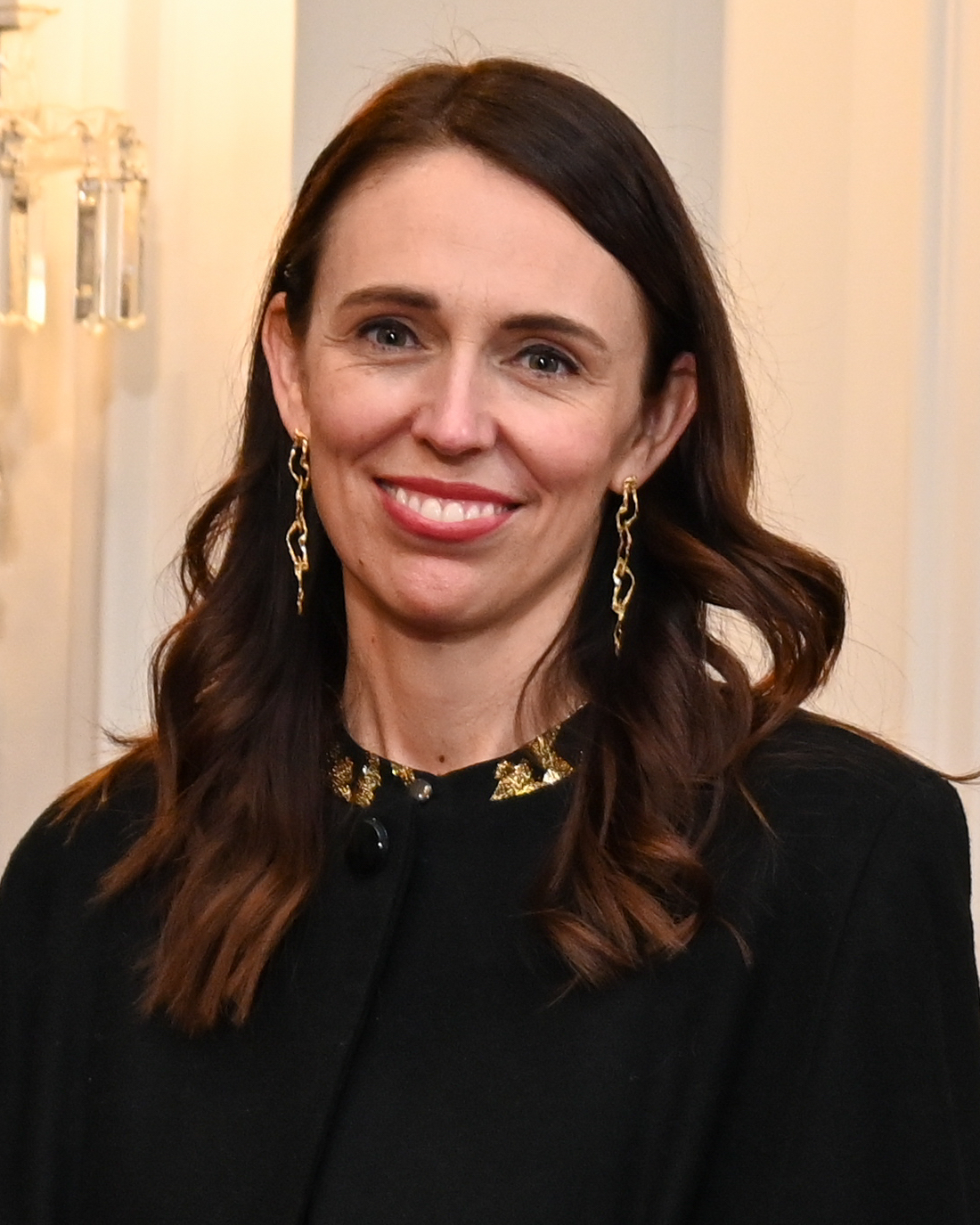
Jacinda Ardern

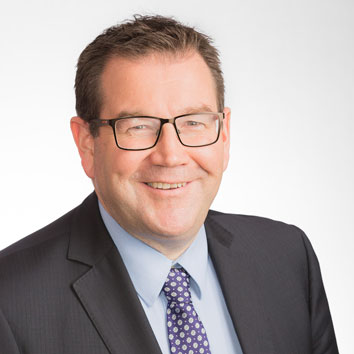
Grant Robertson

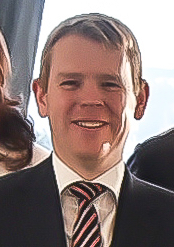
Chris Hipkins

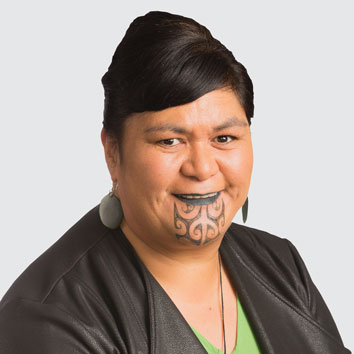
Nanaia Mahuta

=== Other party leaders in parliament ===
- National – Christopher Luxon (leader of the Opposition)
- Green – James Shaw until 23 July and from 10 September, and Marama Davidson
- ACT – David Seymour
- Māori Party – Rawiri Waititi and Debbie Ngarewa-Packer
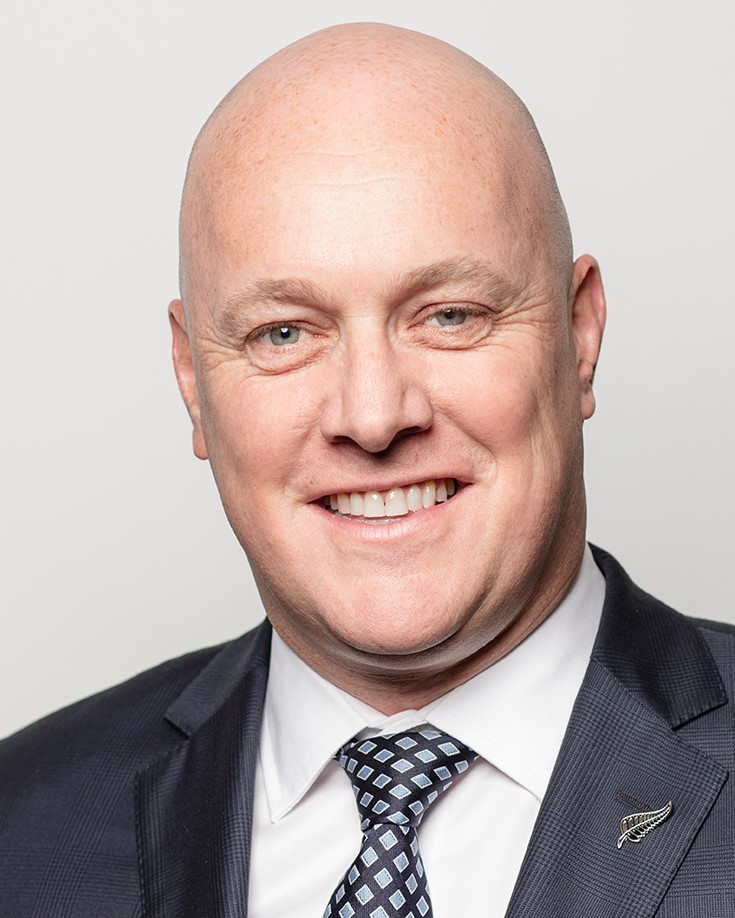
Christopher Luxon

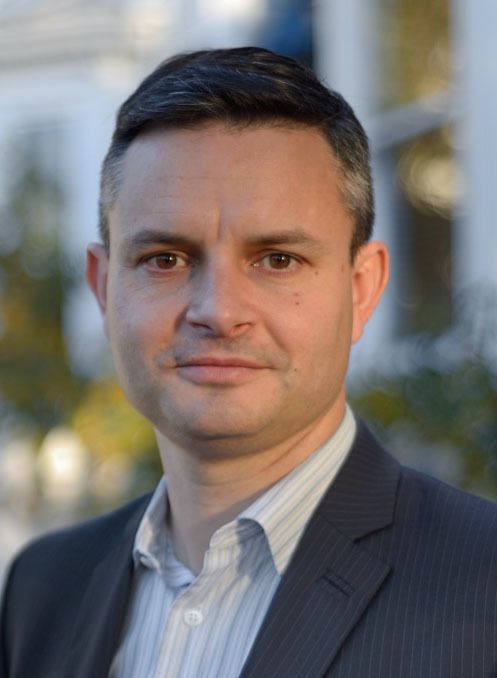
James Shaw

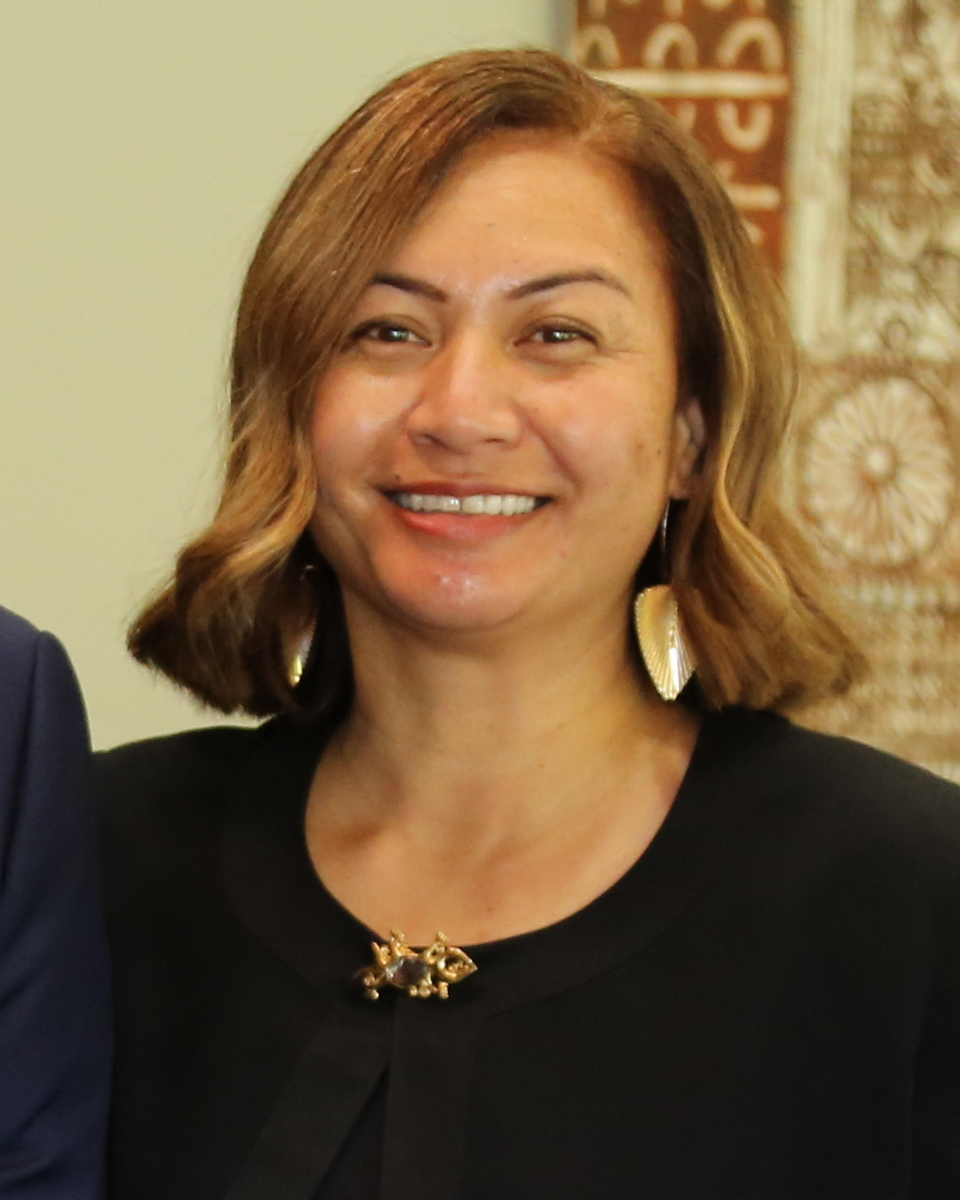
Marama Davidson

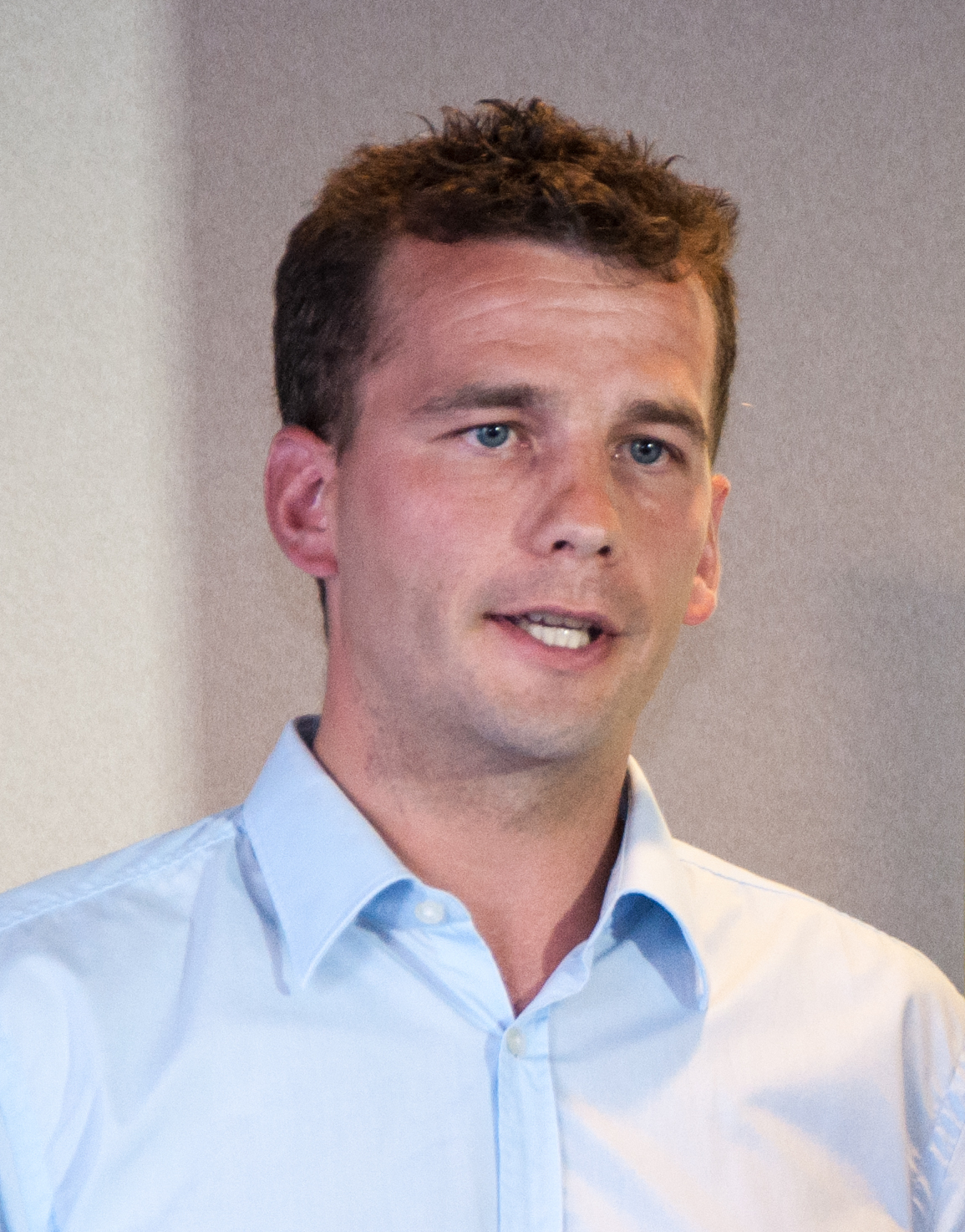
David Seymour

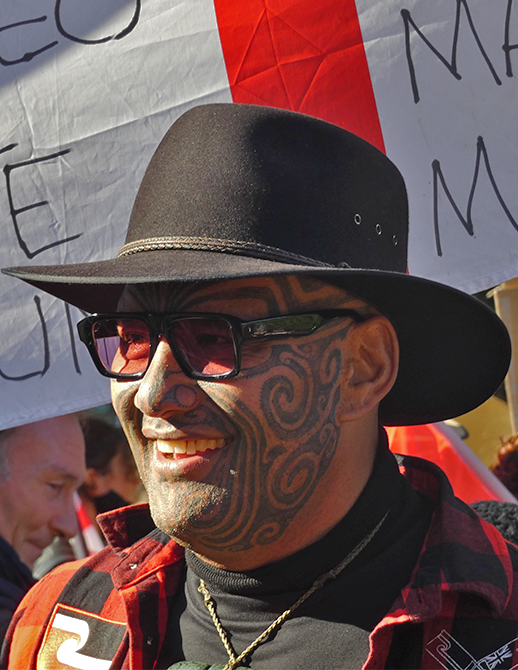
Rawiri Waititi

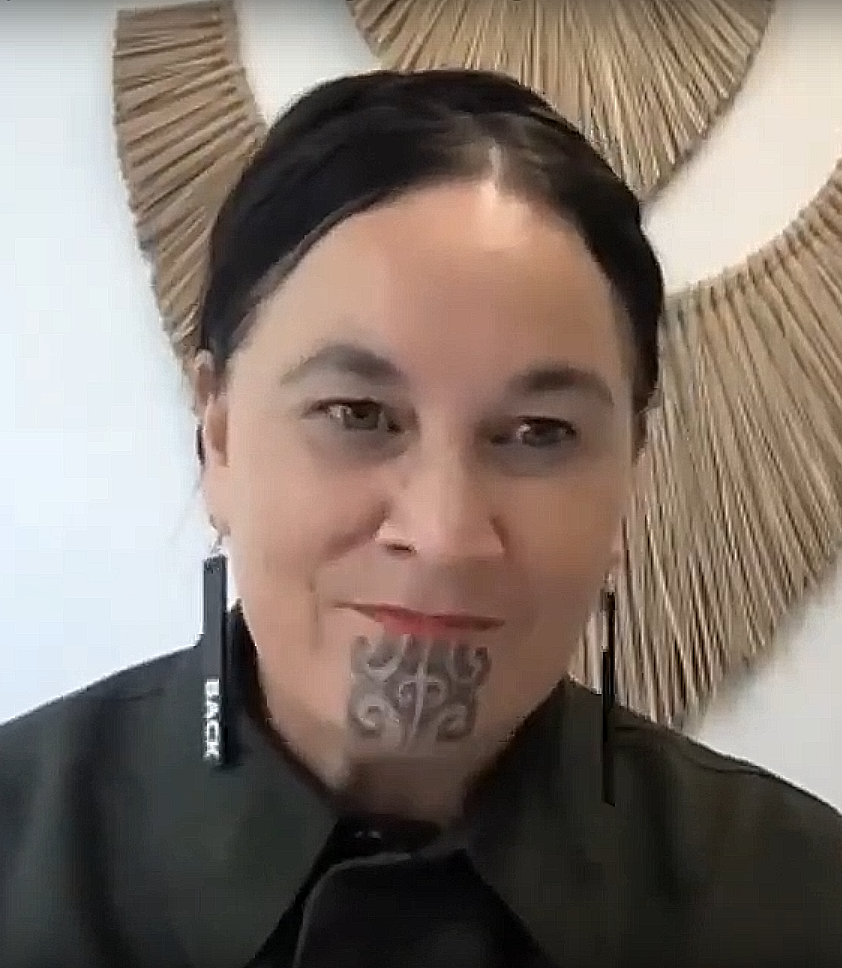
Debbie Ngarewa-Packer

=== Judiciary ===
- Chief Justice – Helen Winkelmann
- President of the Court of Appeal – Stephen Kós, then from 26 April Mark Cooper
- Chief High Court judge – Susan Thomas
- Chief District Court judge – Heemi Taumaunu
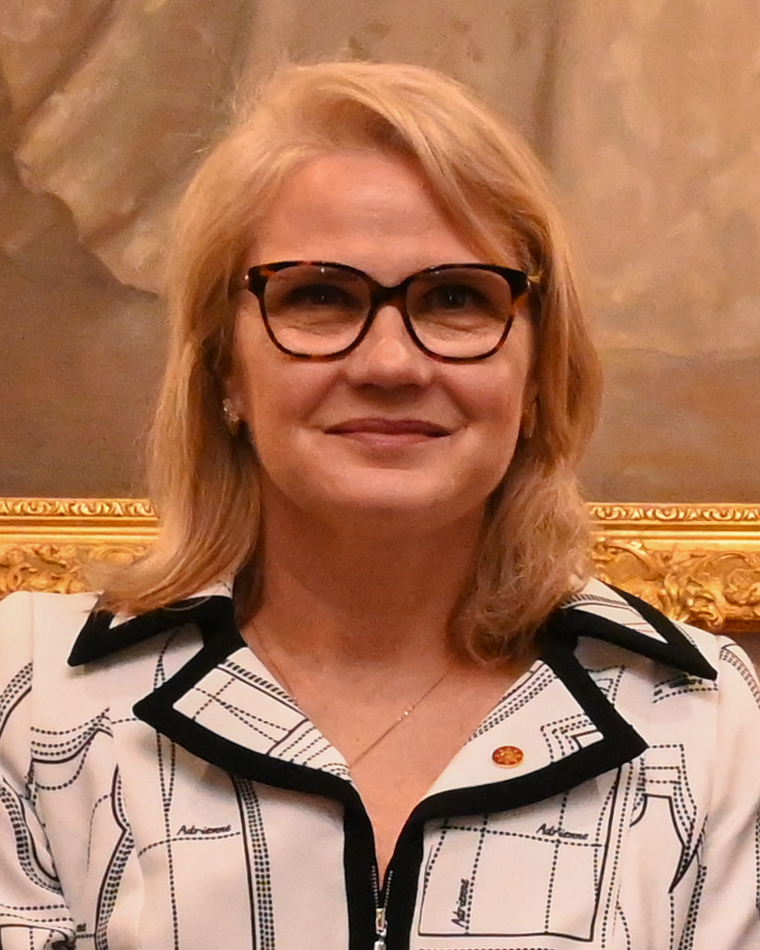
Helen Winkelmann

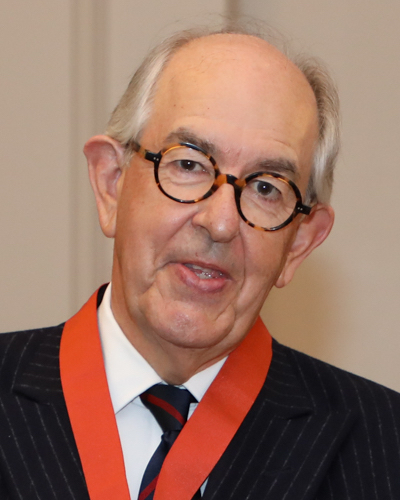
Stephen Kós

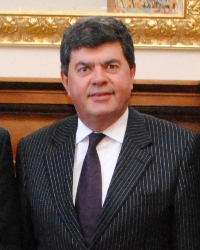
Mark Cooper

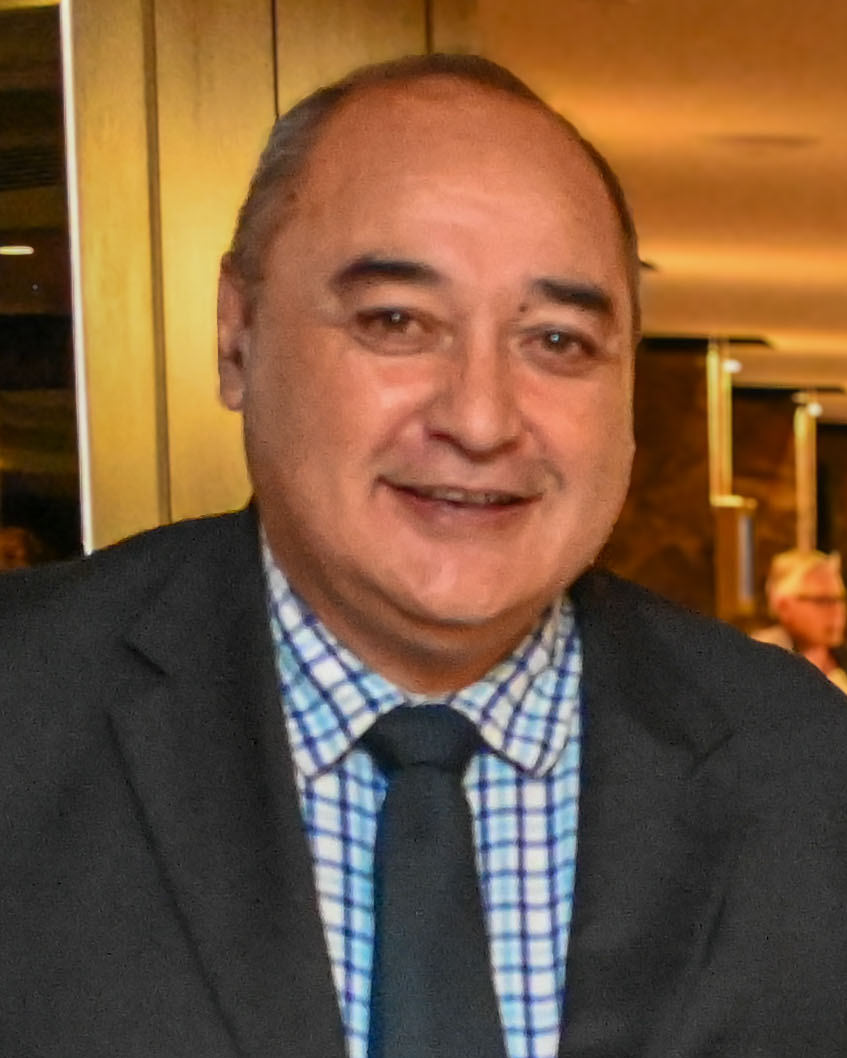
Heemi Taumaunu

=== Main centre leaders ===
- Mayor of Auckland – Phil Goff, then from 16 October Wayne Brown
- Mayor of Tauranga – Anne Tolley (as chair of commissioners)
- Mayor of Hamilton – Paula Southgate
- Mayor of Wellington – Andy Foster, then from mid-October Tory Whanau
- Mayor of Christchurch – Lianne Dalziel, then from mid-October Phil Mauger
- Mayor of Dunedin – Aaron Hawkins, then from mid-October Jules Radich
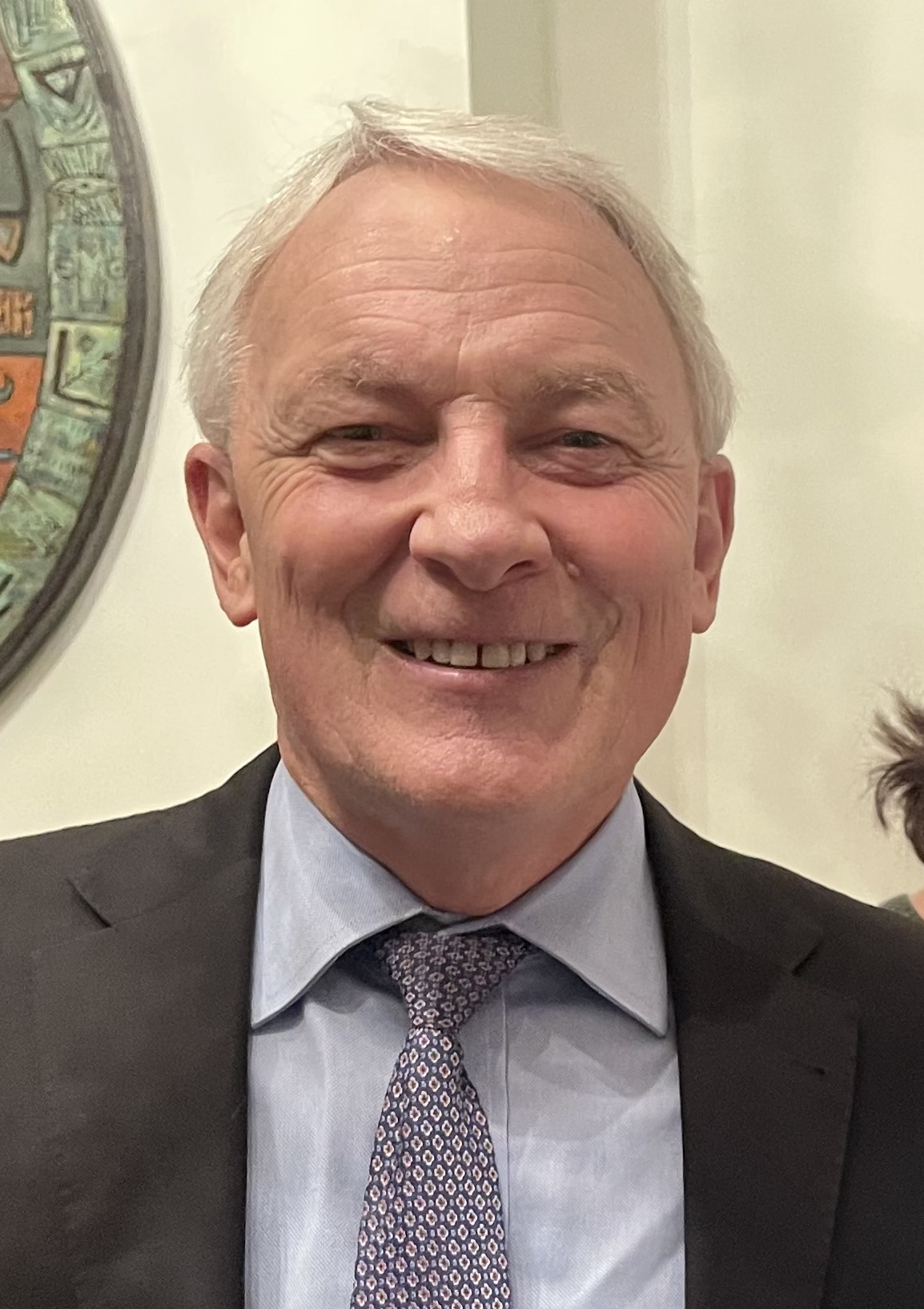
Phil Goff

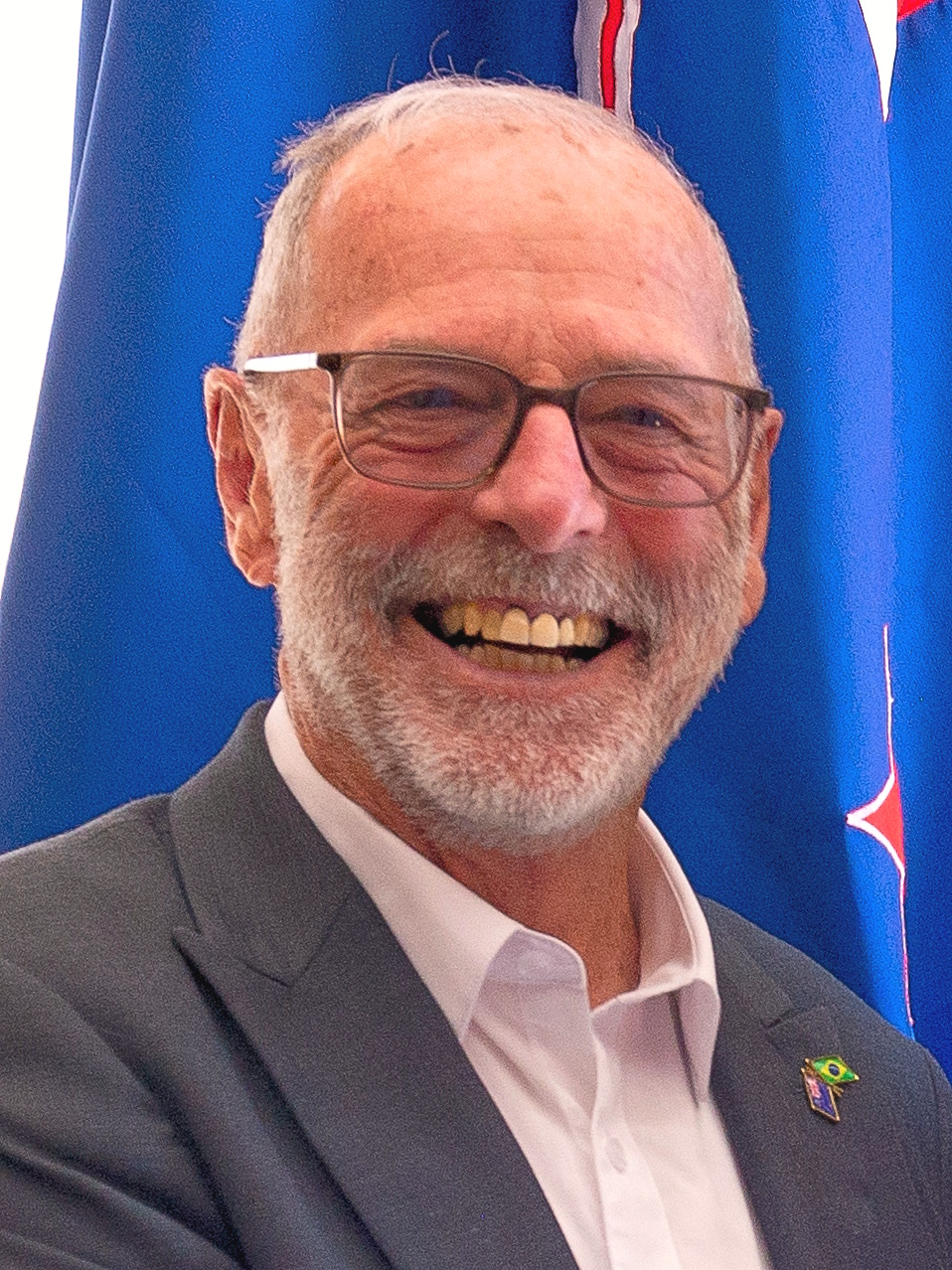
Wayne Brown

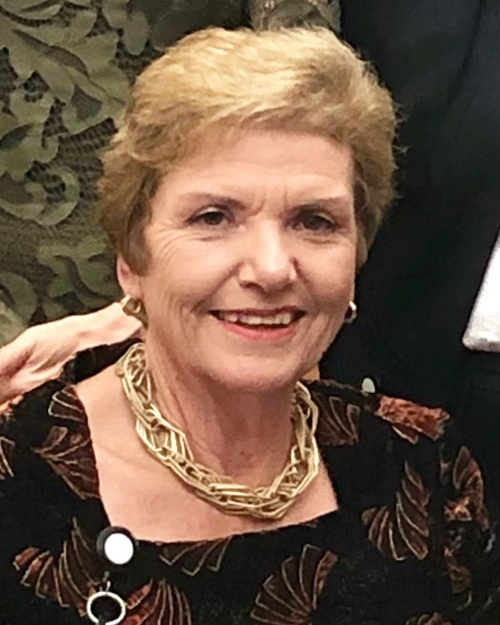
Anne Tolley

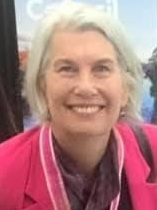
Paula Southgate

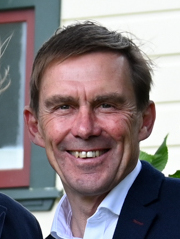
Andy Foster

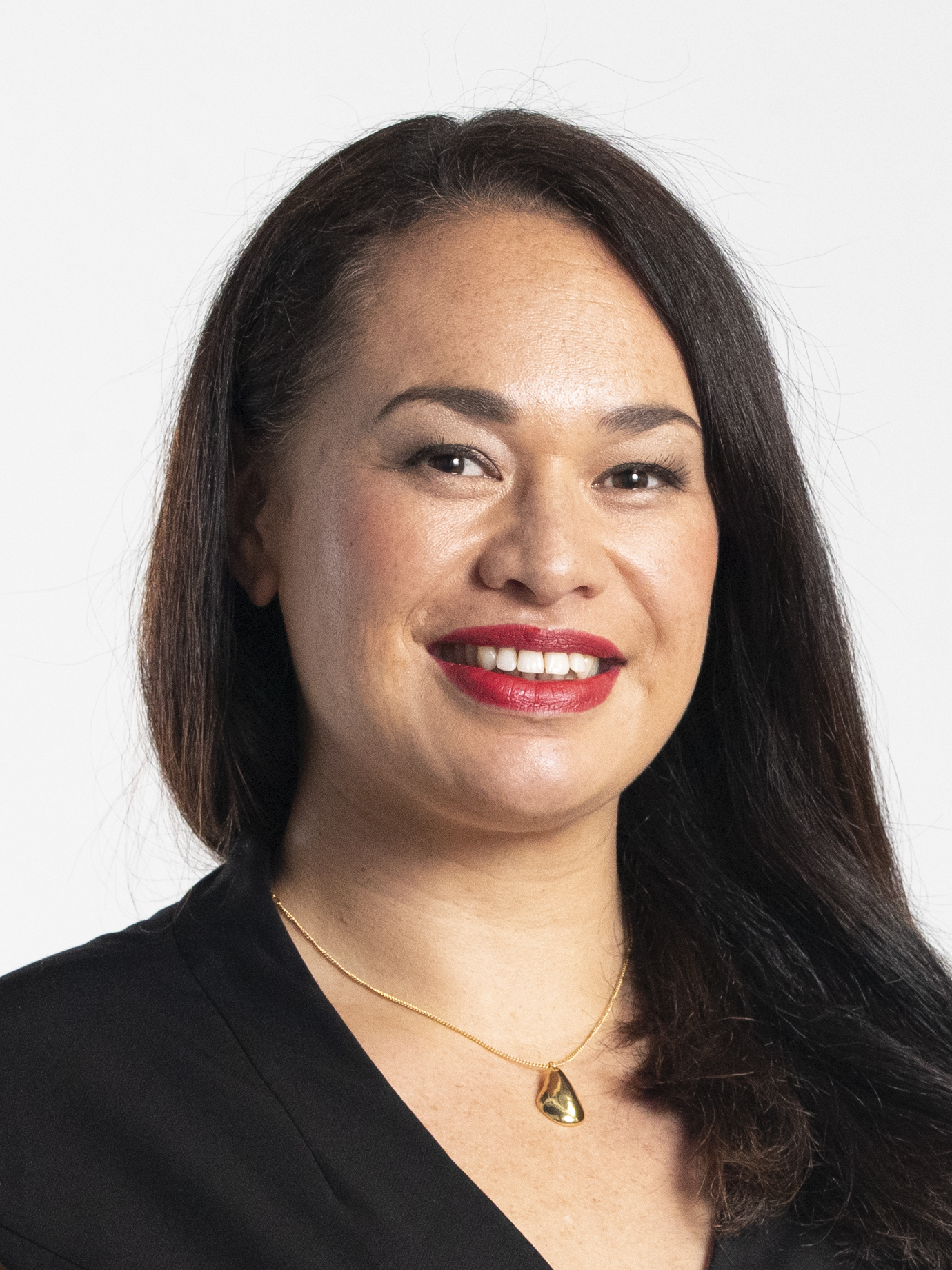
Tory Whanau

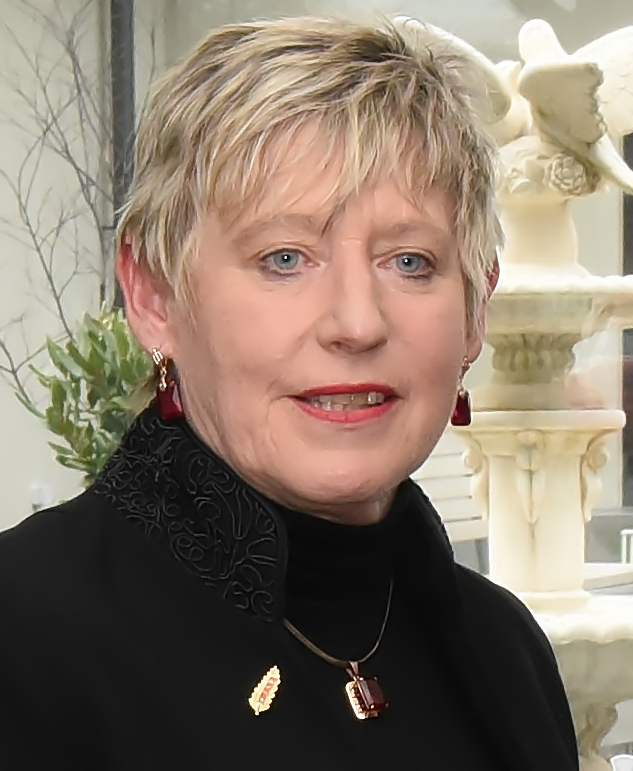
Lianne Dalziel

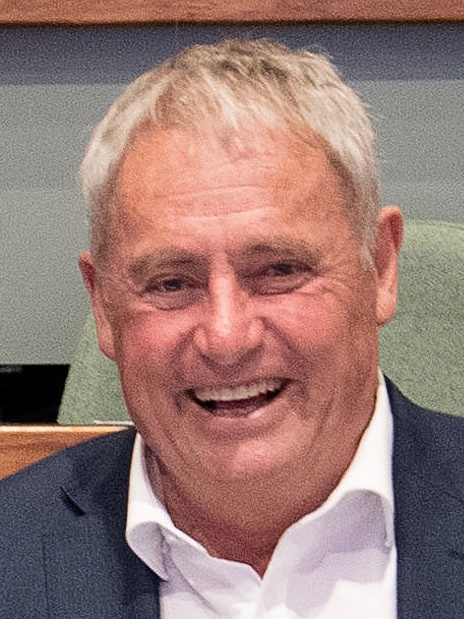
Phil Mauger

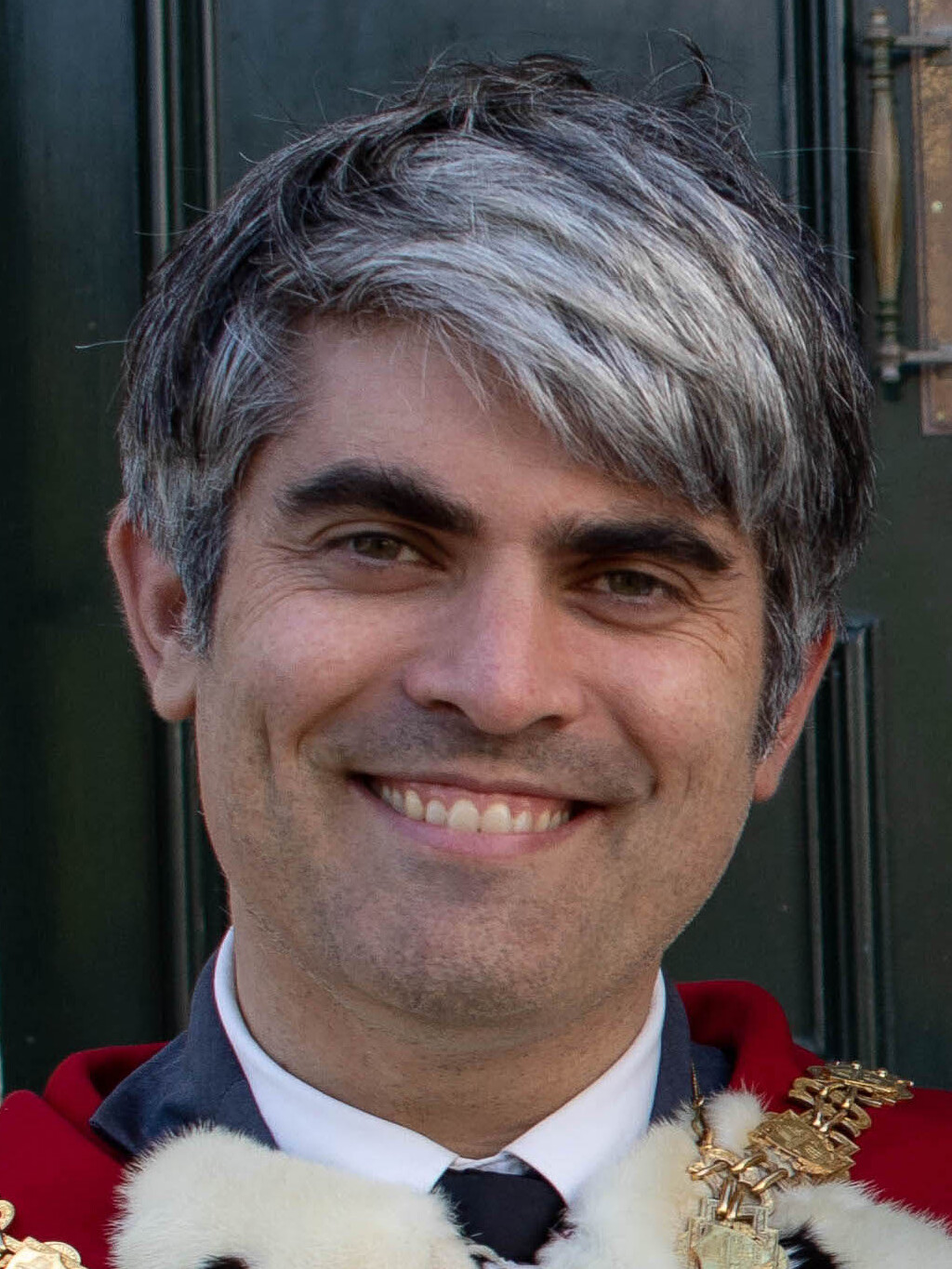
Aaron Hawkins

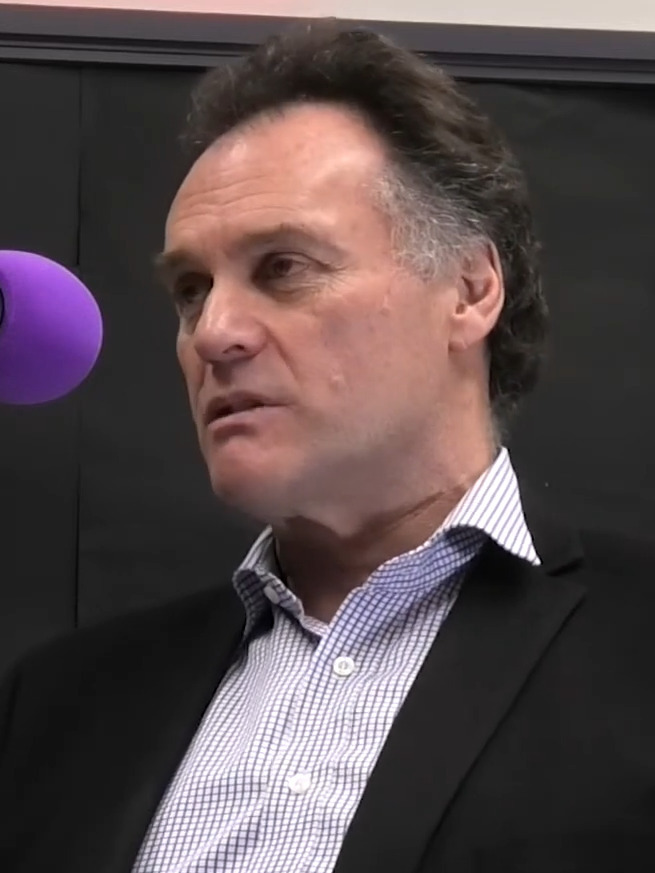
Jules Radich

== Events ==
=== January ===
- 23 January – COVID-19 in New Zealand: The whole of New Zealand moves to red under the COVID-19 Protection Framework at 11:59 pm, after the confirmation of multiple community cases of the COVID-19 Omicron variant.
- 30 January – COVID-19 in New Zealand: Governor-General Dame Cindy Kiro and Prime Minister Jacinda Ardern enter isolation after being deemed to be a close contact of a positive COVID-19 case.

=== February ===
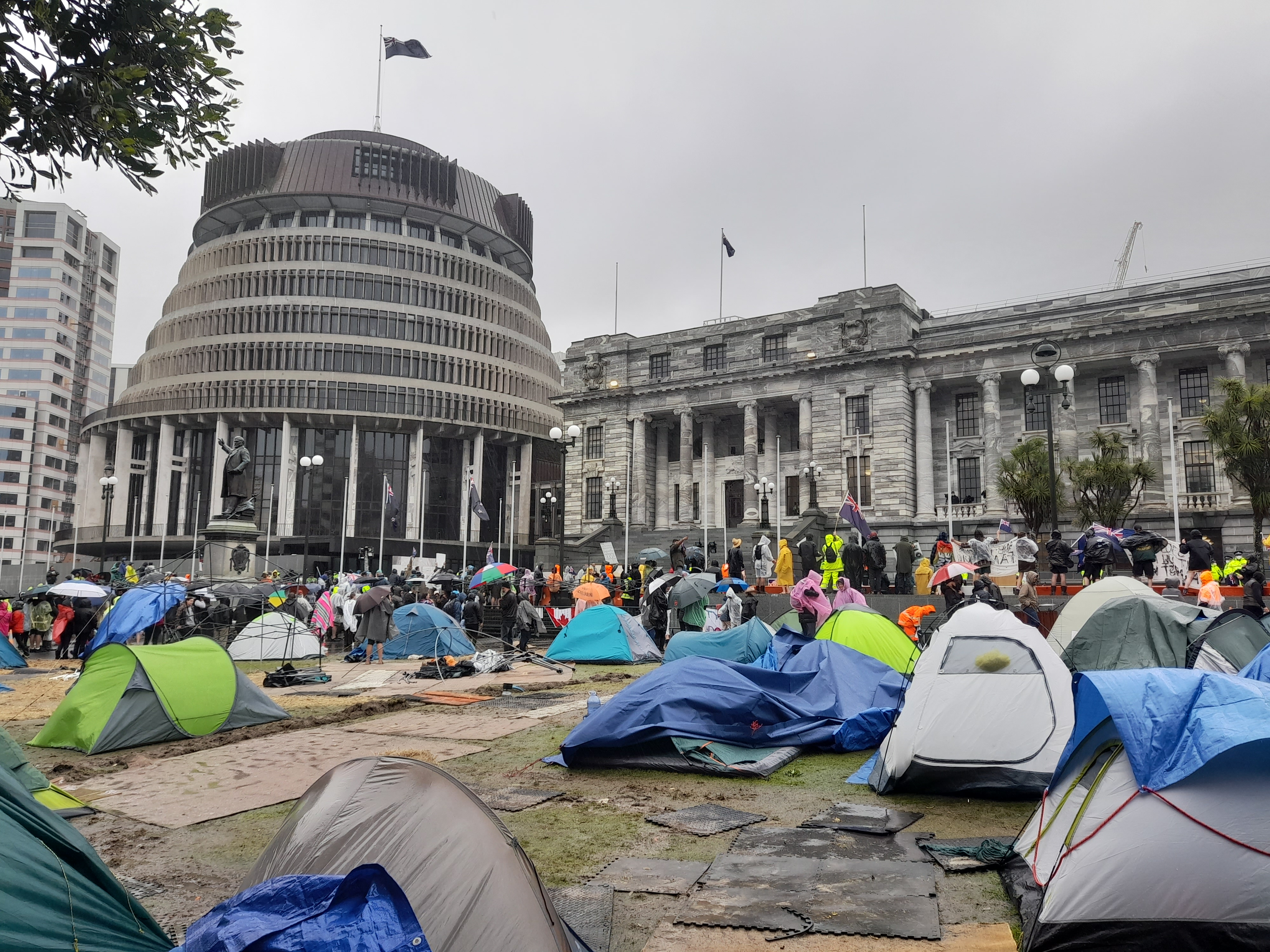
Protestors and their tents at Parliament

- 1 February – COVID-19 in New Zealand: Pregnant journalist Charlotte Bellis is offered a place in MIQ after initially being denied entry.
- 2 February – A state of emergency is issued in the Buller District as heavy rain continues to fall.
- 3 February – The West Coast Region receives a record-breaking amount of rainfall. State Highway 6 is closed.
- 4 February – Civil Defence orders evacuations for low-lying areas of Westport.
- 6 February
  - Platinum Jubilee of Elizabeth II's accession as Queen of New Zealand
  - Protests in Wellington start outside Parliament, and develop into an "occupation", which lasts until 2 March when police moved in.
  - Waitangi Day celebrations are cut back as COVID-19 restrictions force the closure of the Treaty Grounds.
- 7 February – A 21-gun salute is performed in Wellington for the Platinum Jubilee of Elizabeth II's accession as Queen of New Zealand.
- 15 February - The New Zealand Parliament passes legislation banning conversion therapy.

=== March ===
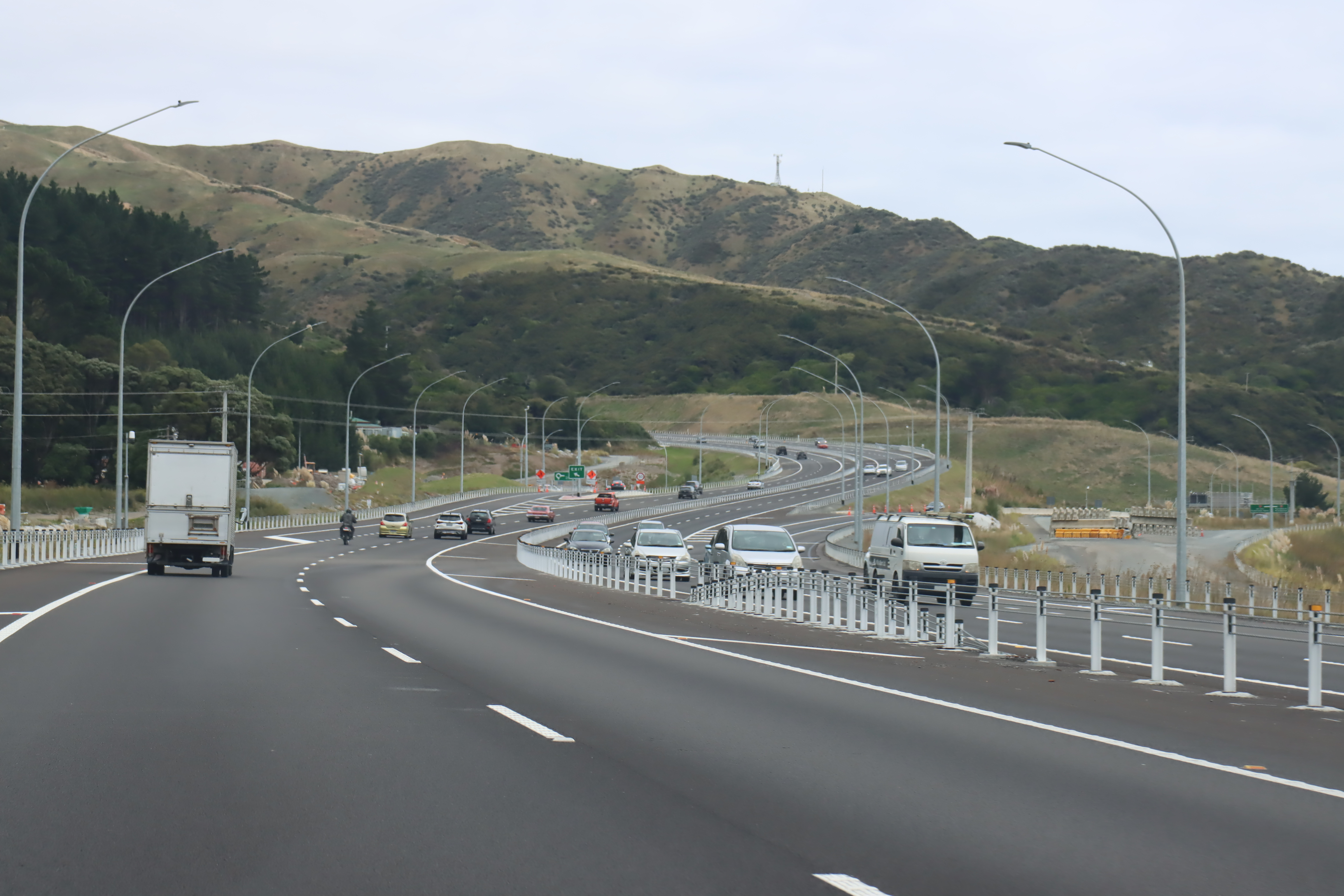
Transmission Gully interchange at Paekākāriki

- 2 March – The protest in Wellington outside Parliament is ended by police.
- 16 March - Parliament passes legislation creating safe access zones around abortion providers.
- 23 March – A state of emergency is declared in Tairāwhiti due to severe weather.
- 14 March – A fuel tax subsidy is introduced to deal with the cost of living crisis.
- 31 March – The Transmission Gully Motorway opens to traffic, having been officially opened by Jacinda Ardern the previous day.

=== April ===
- 7 April – Te Kāhui o Matariki Public Holiday Bill passes its third reading in Parliament, establishing Matariki as a public holiday in New Zealand.

=== May ===
- 9 May – New Zealand's first emissions budgets are released by Climate Change Minister, James Shaw.
- 16 May – The first Emissions Reduction Plan is released.
- 19 May – The 2022 budget is delivered.

=== June ===
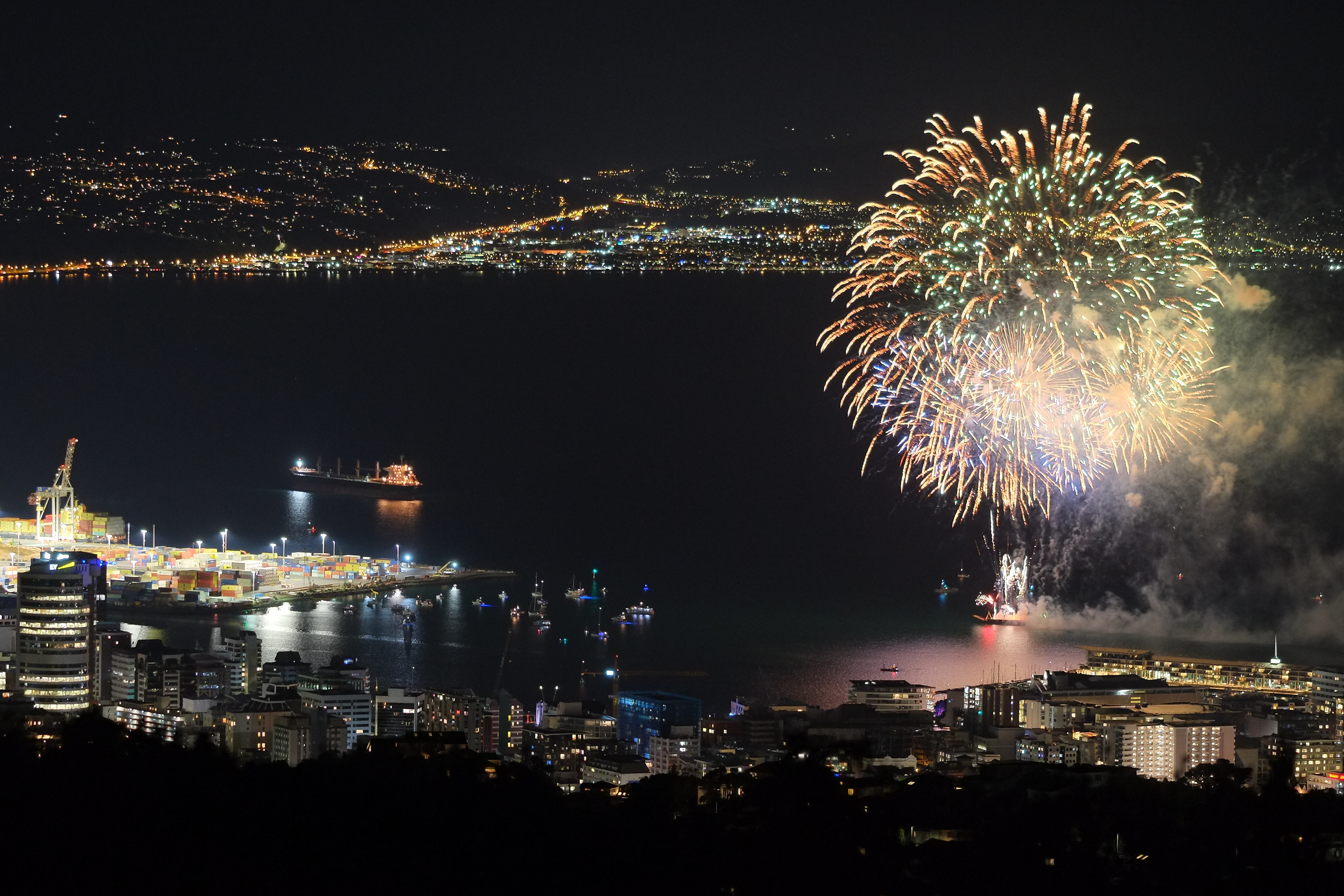
Fireworks over Wellington Harbour for Matariki

- 6 June – The 2022 Queen's Birthday and Platinum Jubilee Honours are announced.
- 8 June – The Supreme Court overturns the wrongful conviction of Alan Hall.
- 18 June – Sam Uffindell of the National Party wins the Tauranga by-election following the resignation from Parliament of Simon Bridges.
- 24 June – Matariki is observed as an official public holiday for the first time.
- 28 June – The Supreme Court rules that Family First does not qualify for charitable status.

=== July ===
- 7 July – A daytime meteor is visible in the lower North Island.
- 9 July – The first case of mpox is detected in Auckland.
- 12 July – The second case of mpox is reported in Auckland.
- 14 July
  - Christchurch City councillors vote in favour of building the $683m stadium, Te Kaha.
  - The Hamilton section of the Waikato Expressway opens to traffic, having been officially opened two days earlier
- 18 to 20 July – Severe winds, heavy rain and flooding cause chaos across the country, as well as leaving more than 100 people trapped in Lake Ōhau and closing a number of state highways.
- 20 July – The Court of Appeal overturns resource consents that allowed two water-bottling companies to extract billions of litres of water from Christchurch aquifers.
- 31 July – COVID-19 in New Zealand: The New Zealand border fully reopens to all travellers at 11:59 pm.

=== August ===
- 11 August – The remains of two children are found in suitcases in Clendon Park, Auckland.
- 12 August – COVID-19 in New Zealand: The first cruise ship since the beginning of the pandemic docks at Queens Wharf in Auckland from Sydney.
- 15 August – A 6.4 magnitude earthquake occurs south of the Kermadec Islands at 1:45am.
- 16 August
  - A state of emergency is declared on the West Coast, following a red-level alert issued by MetService due to heavy rain.
  - Labour's caucus unanimously decides to suspend Hamilton West MP Gaurav Sharma effective immediately in the wake of allegations of bullying of and by MPs.
- 16–20 August – An atmospheric river hits the north of the South Island, with various weather stations across Tasman, Nelson, and Marlborough recording more than 1 m (3 ft 3 in) of rain within four days. State Highway 60 north of Tākaka, the only road connecting to northern Golden Bay / Mohua, was still closed to heavy traffic and only open to light traffic for four hours per day by 1 September.
- 17 August
  - Two restoration workers become the first people to enter the ChristChurch Cathedral since February 2011.
  - A front of severe weather hits the Nelson and Tasman regions causing record flooding and numerous slips. The heavy rain lasts for four days causing extensive damage to Nelson City and surrounding areas. Over five hundred people are evacuated and numerous homes are rendered unlivable. It is estimated that it will take years for the city to recover. Areas of the West Coast and Marlborough are also hit causing extensive flooding and damage. The severe weather heads north to hit Taranaki in the following days. The cost, according to Nelson City Council, is $60 million.
- 22 August – The government takes direct control of Kiwibank through the purchase of holding company Kiwi Group Holdings for an estimated NZ$2.1 billion from the New Zealand Superannuation Fund, ACC, and New Zealand Post.
- 25 August – Corporal Dominic Abelen is killed in Ukraine whilst on a period of leave without pay, and was not on active duty with the NZDF.
- 26 August
  - Fire and Emergency firefighters go on strike for a second time, lasting an hour.
  - Five people are taken to hospital after a gas explosion at a building site in Auckland's Wynyard Quarter.
- 30 August – A person is shot in the Christchurch suburb of Linwood, leading to a manhunt.

=== September ===
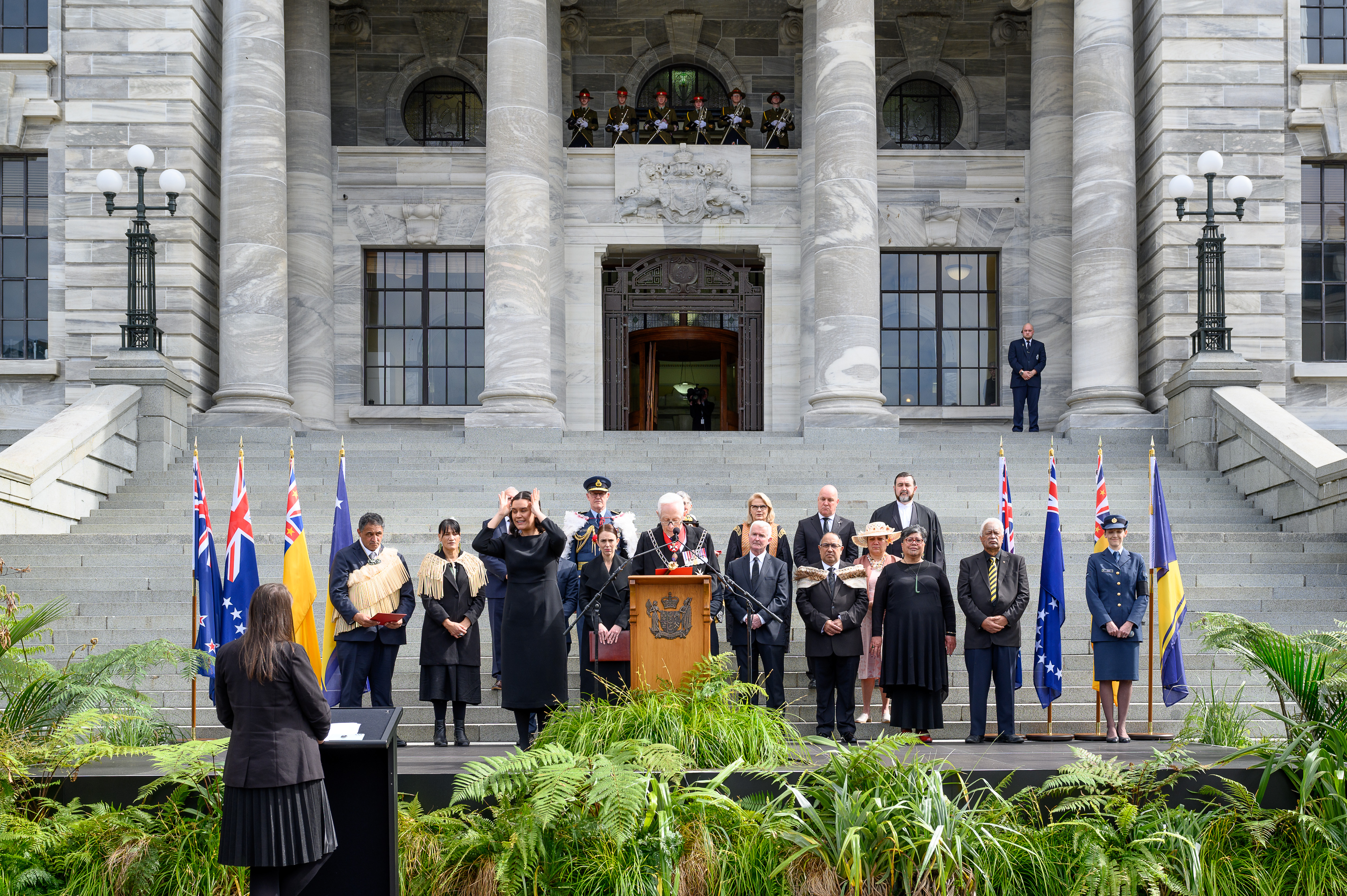
Proclamation of accession ceremony for King Charles III in Wellington

- 8 September – Accession of Charles III as King of New Zealand on the death of Elizabeth II.
- 11 September – Charles III is proclaimed King of New Zealand on the steps of Parliament House, Wellington.
- 12 September – COVID-19 in New Zealand: The COVID-19 Protection Framework ends at 11:59 pm, resulting in the removal of most pandemic-related restrictions.
- 19 September – New Zealand representatives attend the funeral of Queen Elizabeth II in London.
- 26 September – A state memorial service for Queen Elizabeth II with a national holiday is held at the Wellington Cathedral of St Paul.
- 28 September – The first Costco store in New Zealand opens in Westgate.

=== October ===
- 1 October – The AMC+ streaming service launches in New Zealand.
- 6 October
  - Heavy snow hits much of the South Island, Wellington, Taranaki and the Central Plateau, causing problems for farmers and viticulturists, and closing state highways.
  - The first community transmission of monkeypox in New Zealand is confirmed.
- 7 October – The Supreme Court posthumously quashes the 1993 child abuse convictions of Peter Ellis.
- 8 October – The 2022 local elections are held.
- 19 October – A digital security breach allows personal details about most University of Otago students to be viewable to others.
- 20 October – Tractors drive through city centres in a protest led by the farmer advocacy group Groundswell.
- 21 October – Minister of Transport Michael Wood announces a $1.3 billion public transport single payment system, to rolled out across the country in stages, starting with Canterbury in 2024.
- 25 October:
  - Women make up 50% of MPs in the New Zealand Parliament for the first time, as Soraya Peke-Mason is sworn in as a list MP.
  - The Employment Court of New Zealand's Chief Judge Christina Inglis rules in favour of four Uber drivers seeking a declaration that they were employees rather than contractors.

=== November ===
- 2 November – The evacuation of 130 people from a holiday park at Woodend Beach north of Christchurch occurs due to a wildfire. About 50 firefighters battled the flames overnight.
- 8 November – A full lunar eclipse takes place.
- 21 November – The Supreme Court rules that current electoral legislation setting the minimum voting age at 18 years violates the Bill of Rights Act 1990.
- 23 November – Murder of Janak Patel
- 23 November – The Reserve Bank lifts the Official cash rate by 75 basis points to 4.25% while forecasting a "shallow recession" in 2023.
- 25 November – The New Zealand Government and Ngāti Mutunga o Wharekauri sign an agreement to settle historical Treaty of Waitangi claims relating to the Chatham Islands.
- 30 November – A magnitude 5.6 earthquake causes a tsunami at Lake Taupō, damaging moored boats.

=== December ===
- 1 December – Graham Philip is sentenced to three years and one month in prison for sabotage, the first conviction for this crime in New Zealand history.
- 10 December – The Hamilton West by-election is won by the National Party candidate, Tama Potaka.
- 26 December – New Zealanders break retail spending record for Boxing Day, with consumers spending $100.5 million.
- 31 December – The 2023 New Year Honours are announced.

== Holidays and observances ==
Public holidays in New Zealand in 2022 are as follows:

- 1 January – New Year's Day
- 2 January – Day after New Year's Day
- 3 January – New Year's Day observed
- 4 January – Day after New Year's Day observed
- 6 February – Waitangi Day
- 7 February – Waitangi Day observed
- 15 April – Good Friday
- 18 April – Easter Monday
- 25 April – Anzac Day
- 6 June – Queen's Birthday
- 24 June – Matariki
- 26 September – Queen Elizabeth II Memorial Day (2022 public holiday only)
- 24 October – Labour Day
- 25 December – Christmas Day
- 26 December – Boxing Day
- 27 December – Christmas Day observed

== Sport ==
=== Commonwealth Games ===
- New Zealand sends a team of 233 competitors across 19 sports

Gold	Silver	Bronze	Total
20	12	18	50

=== Cricket ===
January

- New Zealand and Bangladesh draw 1–1 in a two Test-match series in New Zealand
- Ross Taylor plays his 112th and final Test match for New Zealand after a 15-year career

February

- The New Zealand women's team defeats India 4–1 in a one-day international series during the India women's tour of New Zealand
- The Australian cricket team's tour of New Zealand, to play three Twenty20 International matches, scheduled for March, is cancelled because of COVID-19

March

- The two-Test series in New Zealand between South Africa and New Zealand ends, with the series drawn 1–1

April

- The 2022 Women's Cricket World Cup, held at six venues around New Zealand, concludes, with Australia defeating England in the final
- The Dutch cricket team's tour New Zealand ends, with New Zealand winning the ODI series 3–0

June

- The New Zealand men's team is defeated 3–0 in a three Test series against England in England

July

- The New Zealand men's team tours Ireland, winning both the ODI series and T20 international series 3–0

=== Horse racing ===
==== Harness racing ====
- Auckland Cup – Self Assured
- New Zealand Cup – Copy That
- Rowe Cup – Bolt For Brilliance

==== Thoroughbred racing ====
- Auckland Cup – Uareastar
- New Zealand Cup – Aljay
- Wellington Cup – Lincoln King

=== Olympics ===
- New Zealand sends a team of 15 competitors across five sports.
- Zoi Sadowski-Synnott wins the women's snowboard slopestyle, becoming the first New Zealander to win a Winter Olympics gold medal.
- Nico Porteous wins the men's freestyle skiing halfpipe, becoming the first New Zealand male and youngest New Zealander to win a Winter Olympics gold medal.

Gold	Silver	Bronze	Total
2	1	0	3

=== Paralympics ===
- New Zealand sends a team of three alpine skiers
- Corey Peters and Adam Hall each win two medals

Gold	Silver	Bronze	Total
1	1	2	4

=== Rowing ===
- New Zealand Secondary School Championships (Maadi Cup)
  - Maadi Cup (boys' U18 coxed eight) – Hamilton Boys' High School
  - Levin Jubilee Cup (girls' U18 coxed eight) – Rangi Ruru Girls' School
  - Star Trophy (overall points) – Rangi Ruru Girls' School

=== Rugby union ===
- 8 October – 12 November – The 2021 Rugby World Cup for women will be held at three venues in the upper North Island

=== Shooting ===
- Ballinger Belt – Mike Collings (Te Puke)

=== Squash ===
- 1 March – Paul Coll becomes the first New Zealand man to reach World No. 1 in the official men's squash world ranking

=== Trampoline ===
- Dylan Schmidt wins the men's individual trampoline title at the 2022 Trampoline Gymnastics World Championships
- Bronwyn Dibb wins the women's double-mini trampoline title at the 2022 Trampoline Gymnastics World Championships

== Deaths ==
=== January ===
- 1 January – Bob Leamy, Roman Catholic prelate, bishop of Rarotonga (1984–1996) (born 1934).
- 3 January
  - Doug Baldwin, dairy farmer, market gardener and floriculturist, Fieldays organiser (born 1938).
  - Tony Mackintosh, cricket umpire (born 1931).
  - Tu'u Maori, rugby league player (Papua New Guinea national team) (born 1988).
- 5 January – Rose Beauchamp, puppeteer, actress, musician (born 1946).
- 13 January – Joe Babich, Hall of Fame winemaker, businessman (born 1940).
- 20 January – David Kivell, cricketer (Central Districts) (born 1932).
- 23 January
  - Chris King, cricket umpire (born 1944).
  - Bruce Miller, soil chemist and scientific administrator, director of the Soil Bureau, chief director of the DSIR (born 1922).
- 28 January – Betty Armstrong, early childhood education pioneer (born 1927).
- 29 January – Pete Smith, actor (The Quiet Earth, The Market) (born 1958).
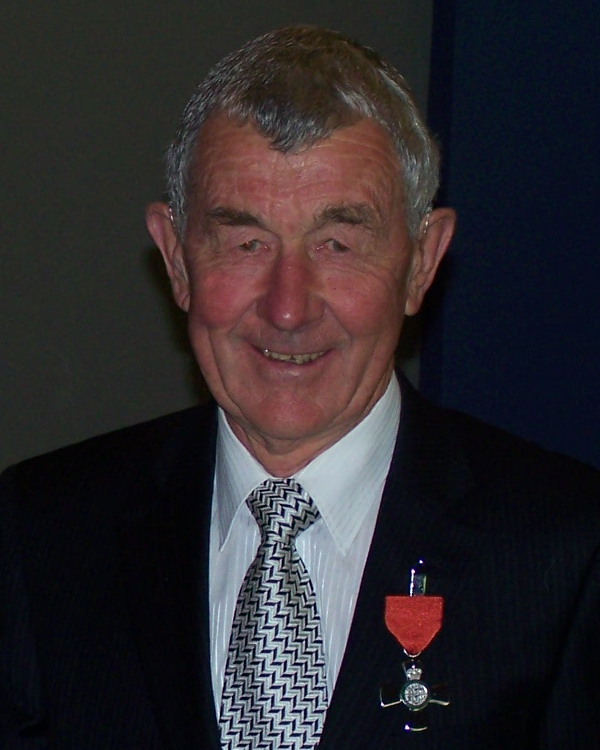
Doug Baldwin

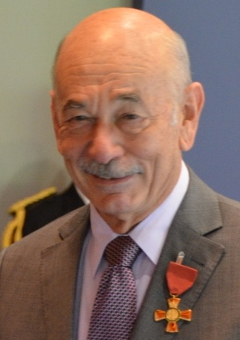
Joe Babich

=== February ===
- 2 February – Roy Purdon, harness-racing trainer (Chokin, Christopher Vance, Petite Evander) (born 1927).
- 6 February – Frank McAtamney, rugby union player (Otago, national team) (born 1934).
- 9 February – Peter Neilson, politician, MP for Miramar (1981–1990), Minister of Works and Development (1990) (born 1954).
- 10 February – Olsen Filipaina, rugby league player (Balmain Tigers, national team) (born 1957).
- 17 February – Vincent Burke, television and film producer (Flatmates), co-founder of Choice TV (born 1952).
- 18 February – Harold Titter, businessman and public administrator, Auckland Area Health Board commissioner (1989), chair of Trustpower (2001–2007) (born 1930).
- 19 February – Peter Grayburn, accountant and businessman (born 1925).
- 23 February – Joeli Vidiri, rugby union player (Counties Manukau, Auckland Blues, national team) (born 1973).
- 24 February
  - Lillian Chrystall, architect, first woman to win a New Zealand Institute of Architects national award (born 1926).
  - Va'aiga Tuigamala, rugby union player (Auckland, national team) and rugby league player (Wigan, Samoa national team) (born 1969).
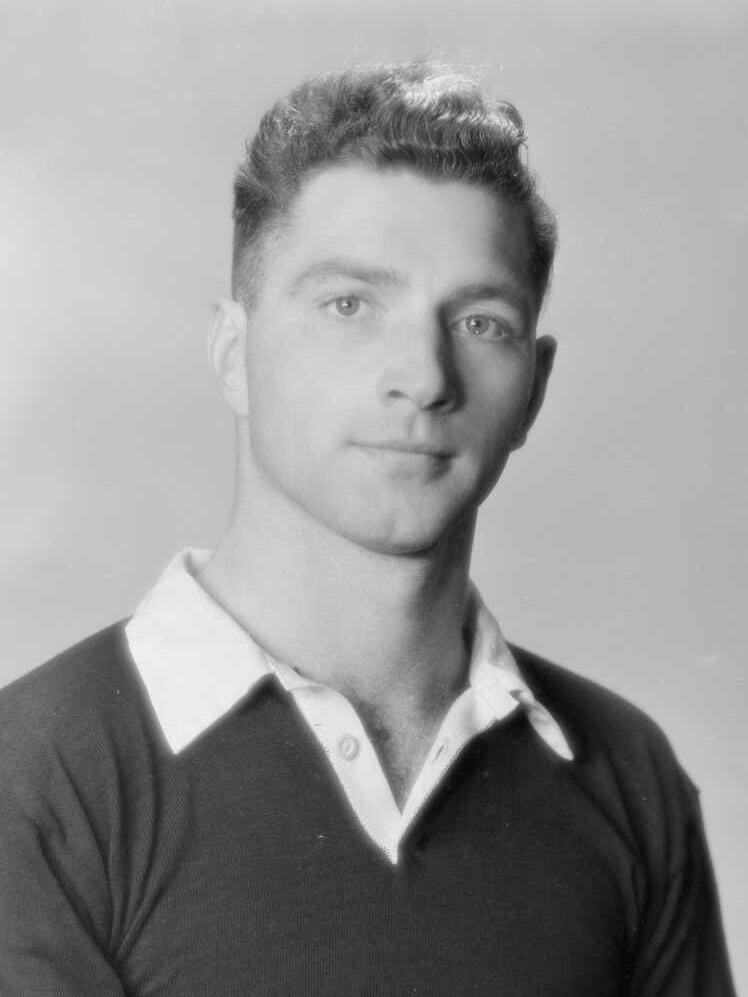
Frank McAtamney

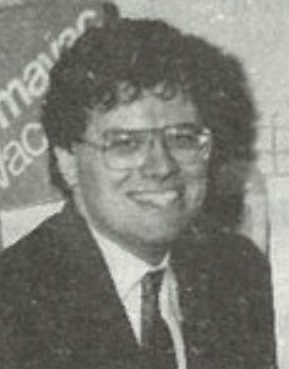
Peter Neilson

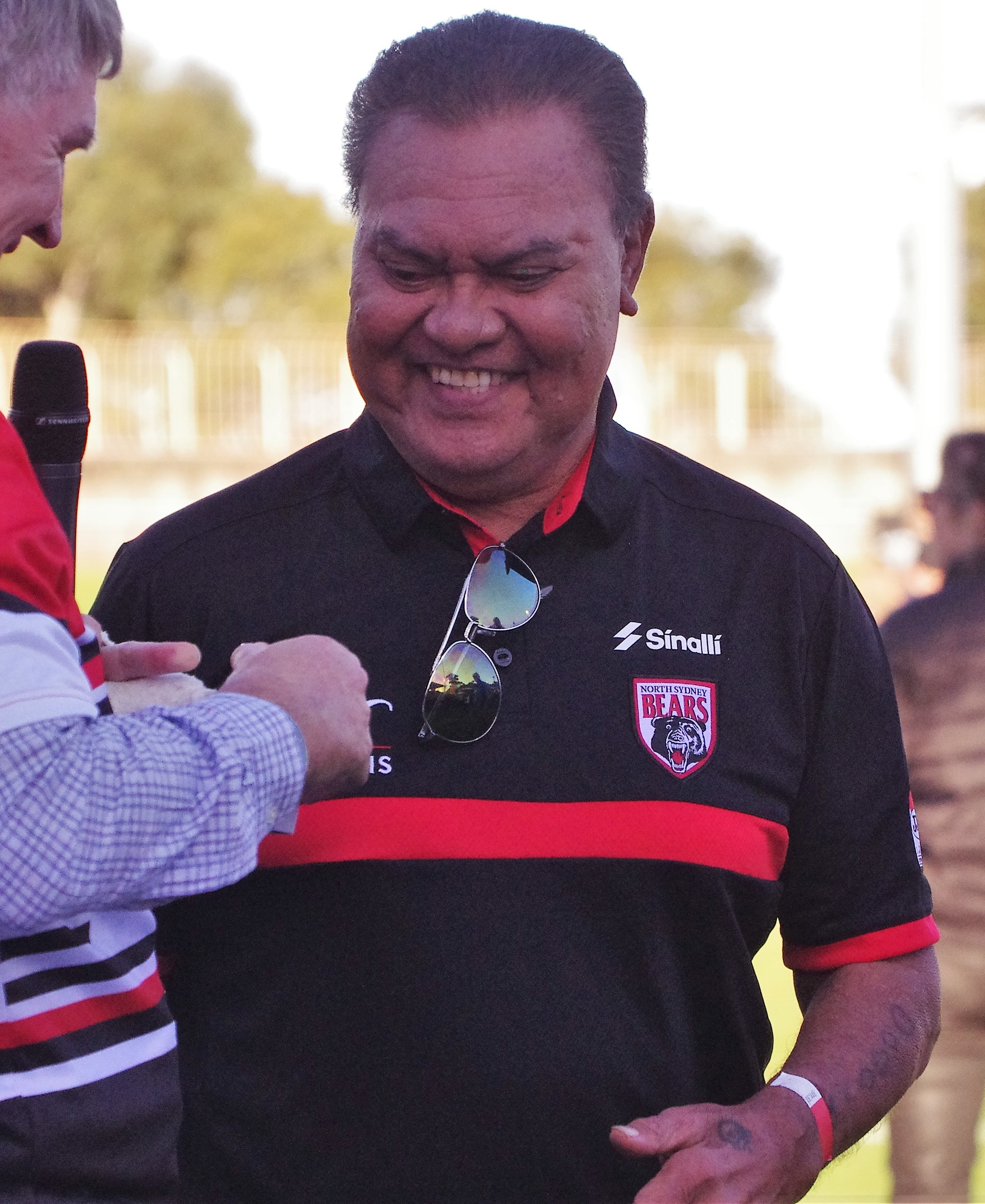
Olsen Filipaina

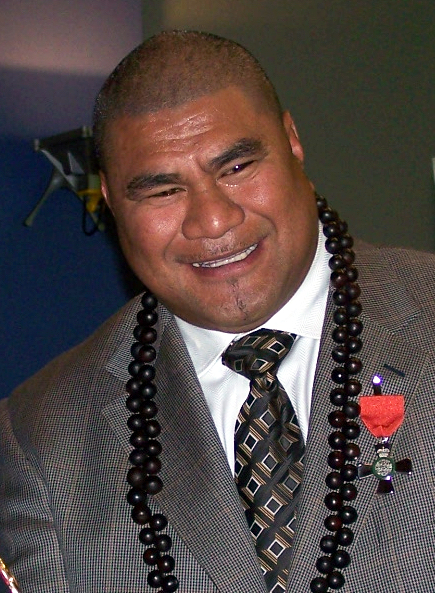
Va'aiga Tuigamala

=== March ===
- 9 March – David Crooks, military leader, Chief of the Air Staff (1983–1986), Chief of the Defence Staff (1986–1987) (born 1931).
- 10 March – Clint Baddeley, trade unionist and local politician, deputy mayor of Waikato District (2007–2010) (born c. 1950).
- 14 March – Terry Dunleavy, Hall of Fame wine industry leader, politician and columnist, Wine Institute of New Zealand CEO (1976–1989) (born 1928).
- 17 March
  - Sir Wira Gardiner, soldier, writer and public servant, director of Civil Defence (1983–1985), chief executive of Te Puni Kōkiri (1992–1995), chair of the board of Te Papa (2010–2013) (born 1943).
  - Mark Hastings, cricketer (Canterbury, national under-19 team) (born 1968).
- 18 March – Murray Day, squash administrator, president of the New Zealand Squash Rackets Association (1968–1971) and the International Squash Rackets Federation (1975–1981) (born 1931).
- 20 March – Lyell Cresswell, composer, New Zealand Arts Foundation Laureate (2016) (born 1944).
- 22 March
  - Doug Carswell, cricketer (Northern Districts) (born 1936).
  - Dame Miriam Dell, botanist and women's advocate, president of the National Council of Women (1970–1974) and the International Council of Women (1979–1984), Member of the Order of New Zealand (since 1993) (born 1924).
- 23 March
  - Russell Kerr, ballet dancer, choreographer and producer, Arts Foundation of New Zealand Icon (since 2005) (born 1930).
  - Busby Noble, Māori activist, Antarctic adventurer (born c. 1959).
- 24 March – Kenny McFadden, basketball player (Wellington Saints) and coach (born 1961).
- 25 March – Cat Pausé, fat studies academic (Massey University) and activist (born c. 1979).
- 26 March
  - George Groombridge, social worker and politician, New Zealand First party president (2008–2010) (born 1928).
  - Mike Riddell, Christian minister and writer (The Insatiable Moon) (born 1953).
- 27 March – Maurice Langdon, cricketer (Northern Districts) (born 1934).
- 28 March – Dame June Jackson, Māori leader, activist and public servant, CEO of the Manukau Urban Māori Authority (1986–2009), member of the Parole Board (since 1991) (born 1939).
- 29 March – Kerry-Jayne Wilson, ornithologist, Robert Falla Memorial Award (2012) (born 1950).
- 31 March – Moana Jackson, lawyer, Māori and indigenous rights activist, convenor of Matike Mai Aotearoa (born 1945).
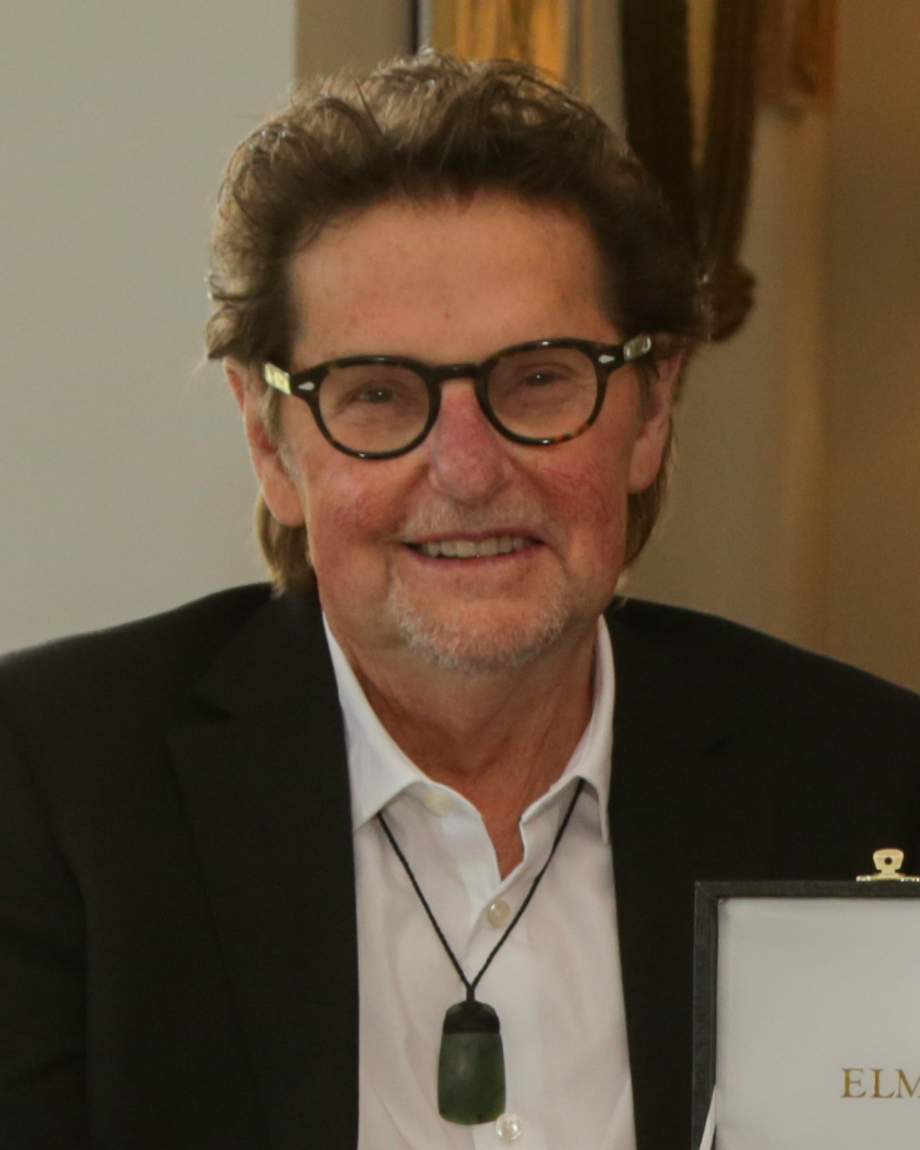
Clint Baddeley

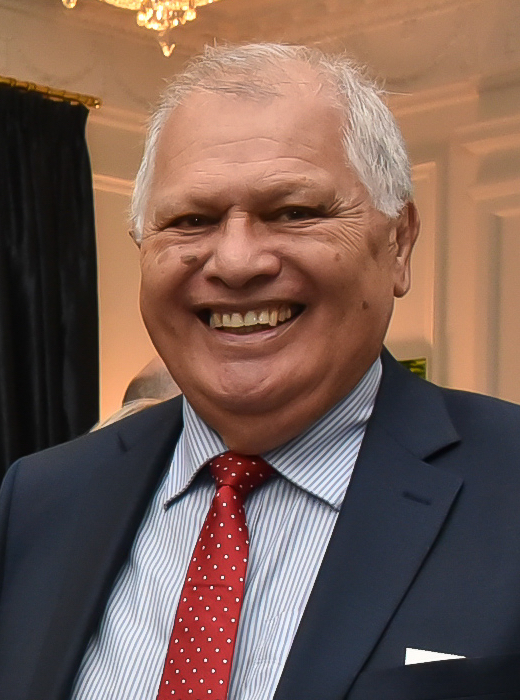
Sir Wira Gardiner

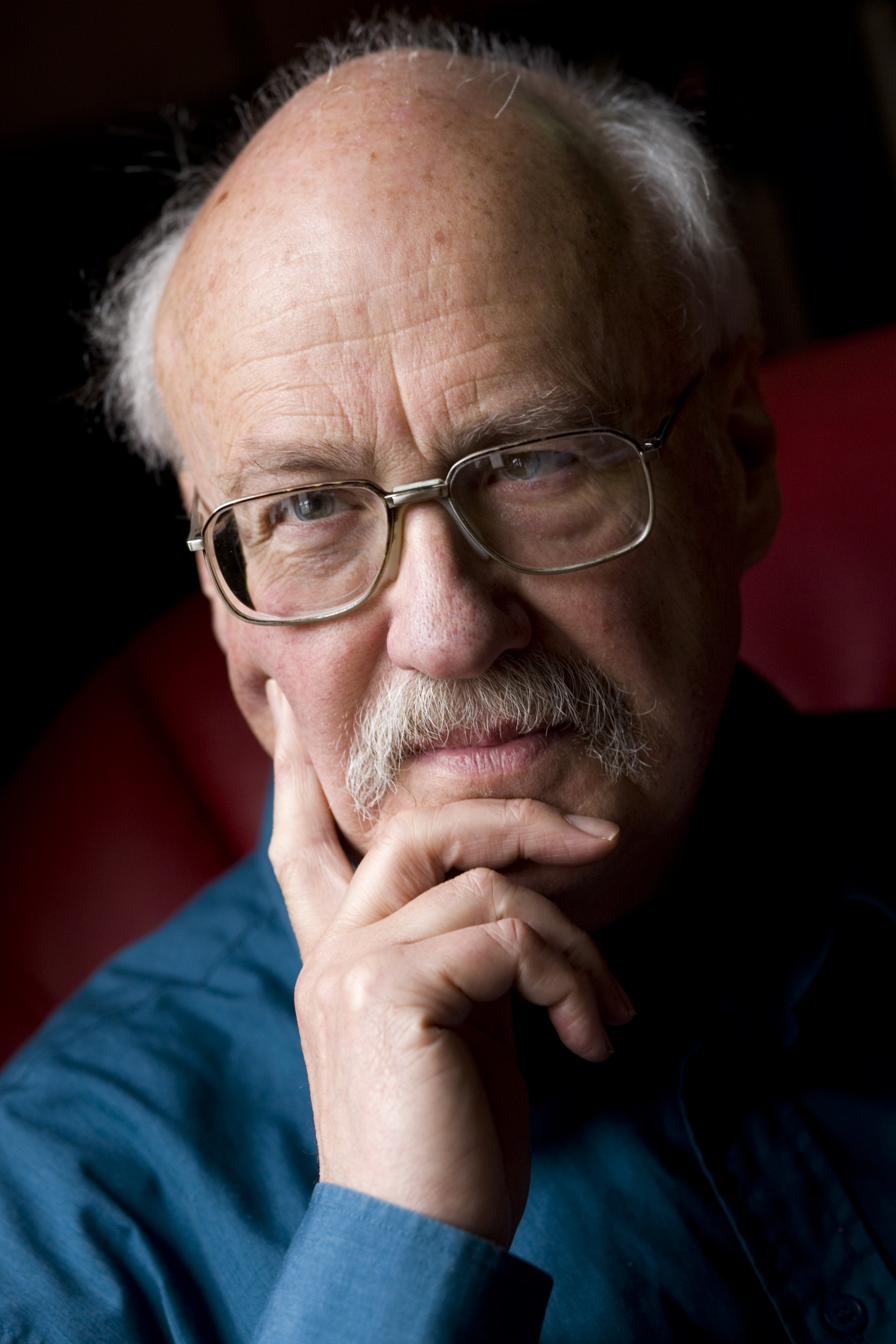
Lyell Cresswell

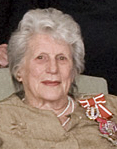
Dame Miriam Dell

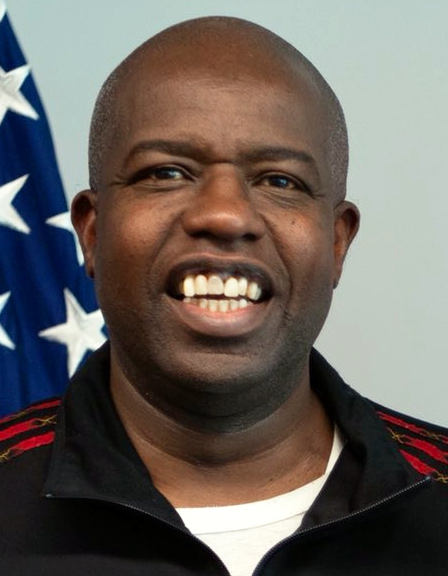
Kenny McFadden

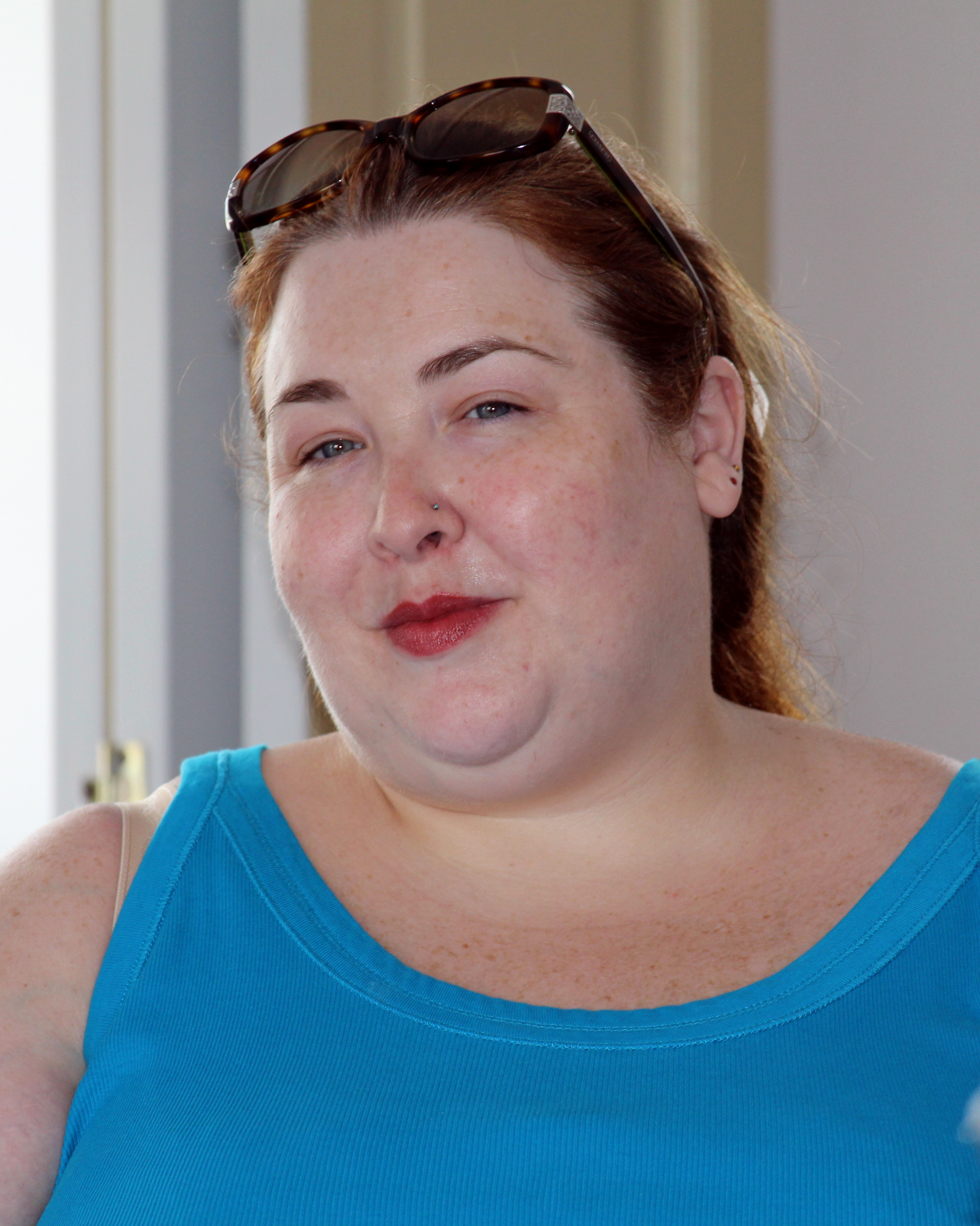
Cat Pausé

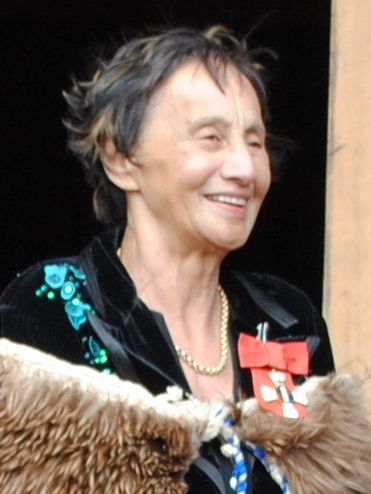
Dame June Jackson

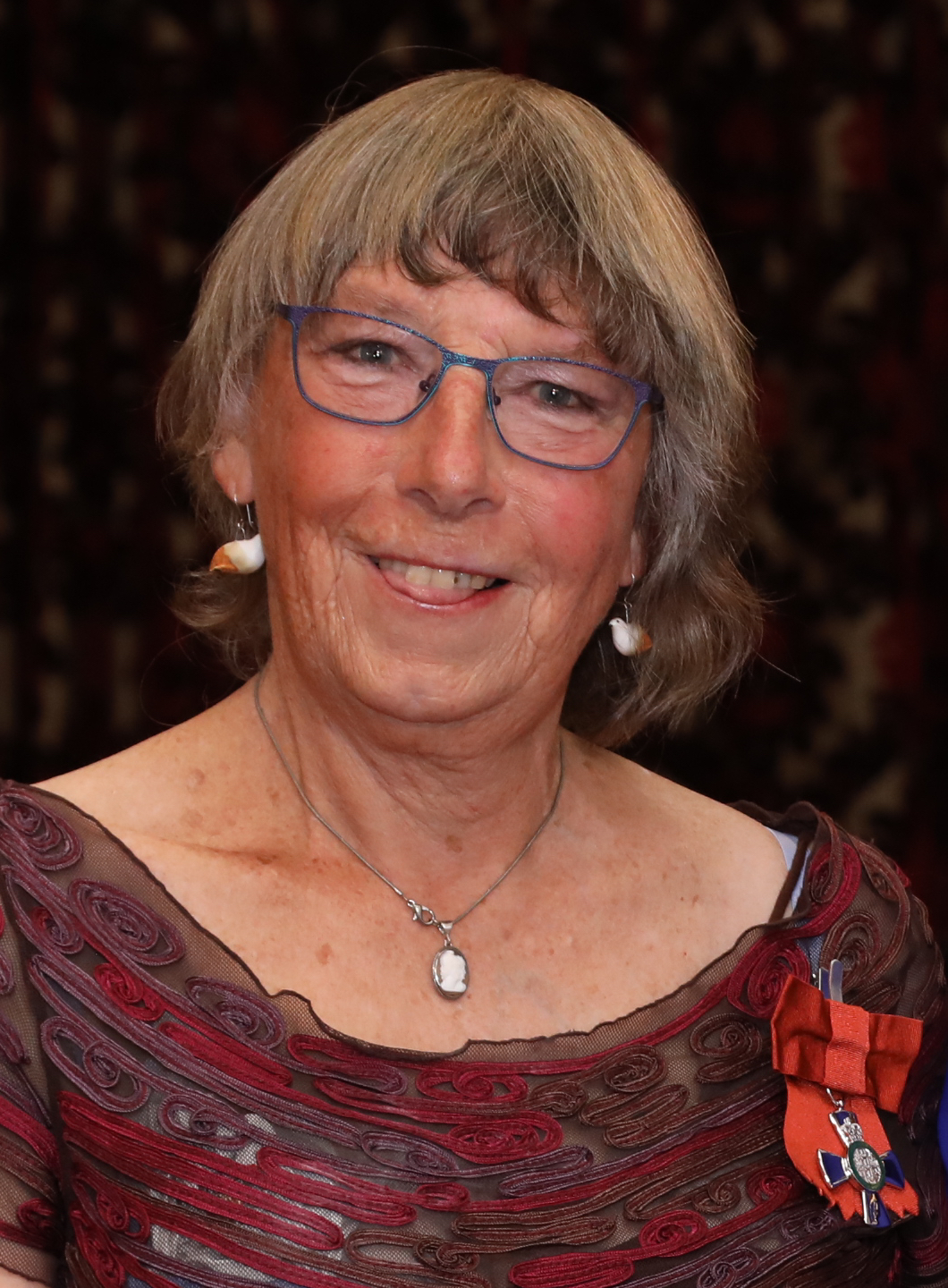
Kerry-Jayne Wilson

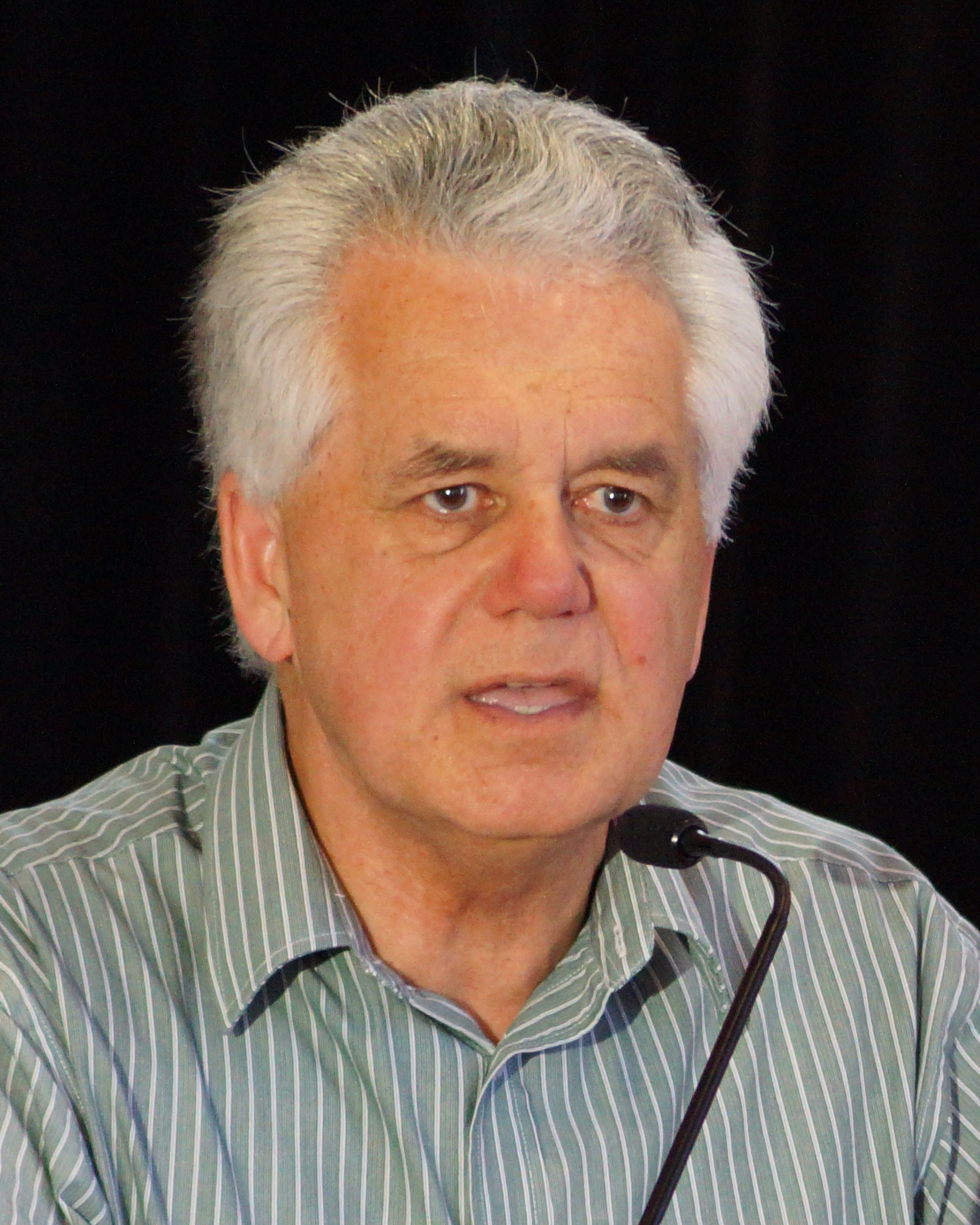
Moana Jackson

=== April ===
- 2 April – Sir Robin Gray, politician, MP for Clutha (1978–1996), Speaker of the House of Representatives (1990–1993) (born 1931).
- 3 April
  - Noeline Brokenshire, cricketer (Canterbury), field hockey player (national team), British Empire Games hurdler (1950), woodturner, and magazine publisher (born 1925).
  - Frances Porter, writer and historian (born 1925).
- 4 April (date of funeral) – Lorraine Warren, professor at Massey University from 2014 to 2019
- 5 April – Leslie Young, economist (born 1949)
- 6 April – John Creighton, rugby union player (Canterbury, national team) (born 1937).
- 8 April – Peter Musson, bassoonist (NZBC National Orchestra, Queensland Symphony Orchestra), bassoon teacher (Queensland Conservatorium) and reed maker (born 1940).
- 9 April – Myra Larcombe, police officer, historian, and swimming coach, Halberg lifetime achievement award (2016) (born 1927).
- 12 April – Alison Gernhoefer, school principal, Westlake Girls High School principal (1981–2011) (born 1936).
- 17 April – Kevin Meates, rugby union player (Canterbury, national team) and businessman (born 1930).
- 20 April
  - Ian Brooks, politician, MP for Marlborough (1970–1975) (born 1928).
  - Roy Moore, rugby league player (Auckland, national team) (born 1928).
- 21 April – Ann Verdcourt, sculptor and ceramicist (born 1934).
- 24 April – Frances Cherry, novelist, short-story writer, and teacher of creative writing, Storylines Notable Book Award (2001) (born 1937).
- 26 April
  - John Gordon, television presenter (A Dog's Show, Country Calendar) and director (Country Calendar), journalist and author (born c. 1944).
  - Sir Christopher Harris, 3rd Baronet, businessman (born 1934).
  - Charles Thomas, architect (born 1928).
- 28 April – Ian Pool, demographer, academic (University of Waikato) (born 1936).
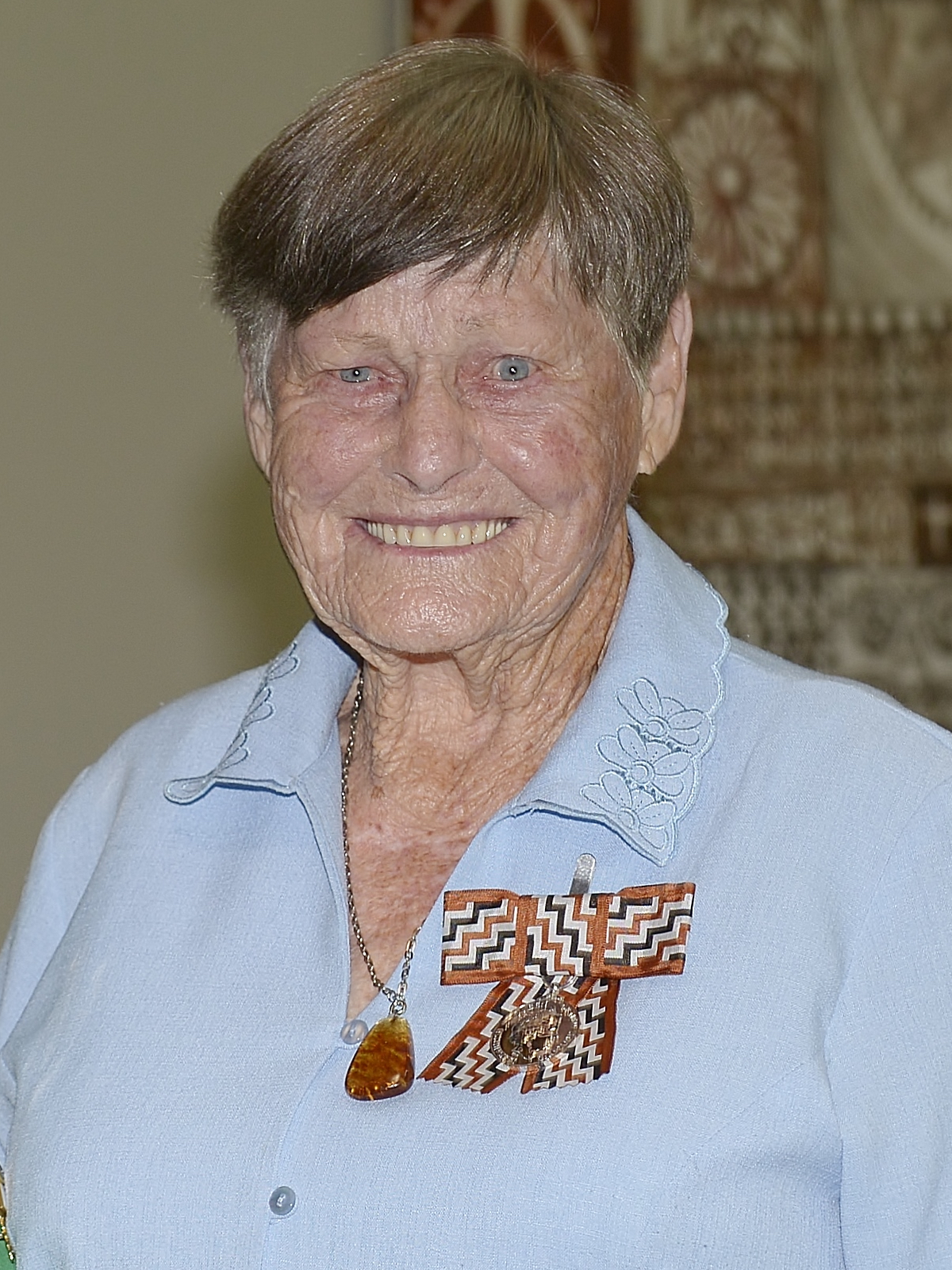
Myra Larcombe

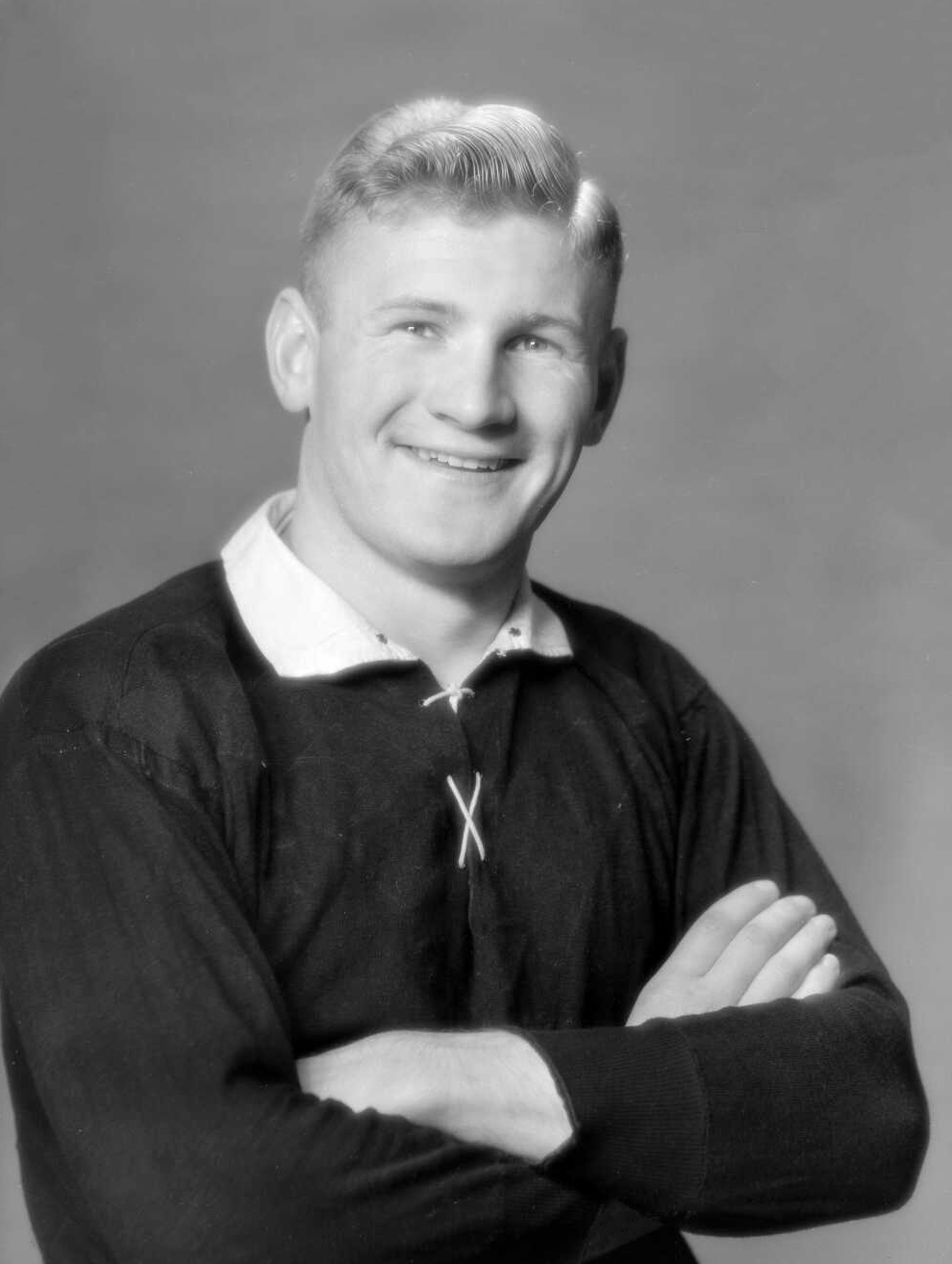
Kevin Meates

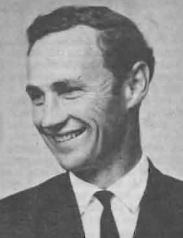
Ian Brooks

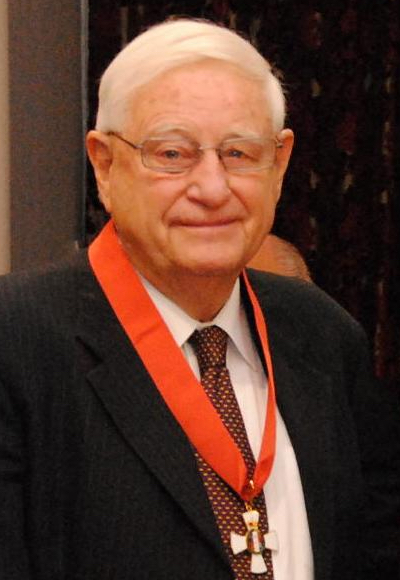
Ian Pool

=== May ===
- 5 May
  - Gary Allen, cricketer (Wellington), harness-racing owner, breeder and administrator (born 1945).
  - Des Taylor, electrical engineering academic (University of Canterbury) (born 1941).
- 9 May – Ian Hodgkinson, physicist (University of Otago), Fellow of the Royal Society of New Zealand (since 1999), T. K. Sidey Medal (2004) (born 1939).
- 10 May
  - Richard Worth, politician, MP for Epsom (1999–2005), National list MP (2005–2009), Minister of Internal Affairs (2008–2009) (born 1948).
  - Doug Caldwell, jazz pianist, arranger, composer, and music teacher (born 1928).
- 11 May
  - Peter Atkins, Anglican priest, Bishop of Waiapu (1983–1990) (born 1936).
  - Harerangi Meihana, Māori religious leader, president of the Rātana Church (since 1999) (born 1934).
- 12 May – Rodney Reid, association footballer (Miramar Rangers, Seatoun, national team) and cricketer (Wellington) (born 1939).
- 16 May – Brian Gaynor, sharebroker, investment analyst, and financial commentator (born 1948).
- 20 May
  - Glenys Arthur, neurologist, member of the Wellington Area Health Board (1989–1991) (born 1936)
  - Dame Aroha Reriti-Crofts, Māori community leader, president of the Māori Women's Welfare League (1990–1993) (born 1938).
  - Bruce Tabb, accountancy academic (University of Auckland) (born 1927).
- 22 May – Joe Hawke, Māori leader (Ngāti Whātua Ōrākei) and politician, Labour list MP (1996–2002) (born 1940).
- 25 May
  - Dick Conway, rugby union player (Otago, Bay of Plenty, national team) (born 1935).
  - Allie Eagle, artist (born 1949).
- 29 May
  - Stan Rodger, trade unionist and politician, president of the Public Service Association (1970–1973), MP for Dunedin North (1978–1990), Minister of Labour (1984–1989) (born 1940).
  - Grattan Roughan, plant biologist (DSIR), Fellow of the Royal Society of New Zealand (since 1988) (born 1937).
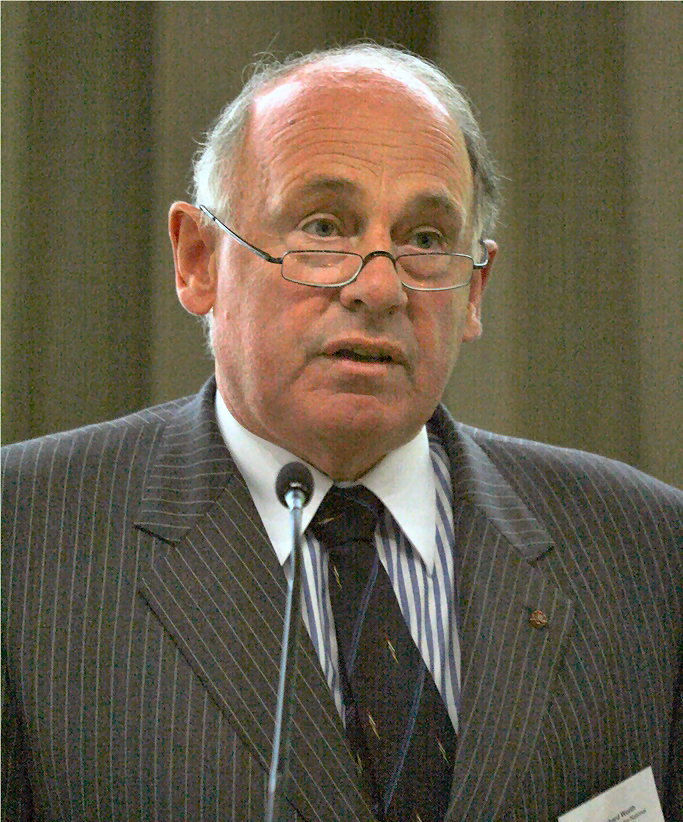
Richard Worth

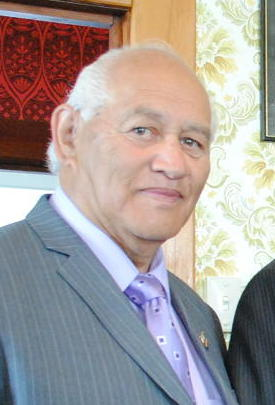
Harerangi Meihana

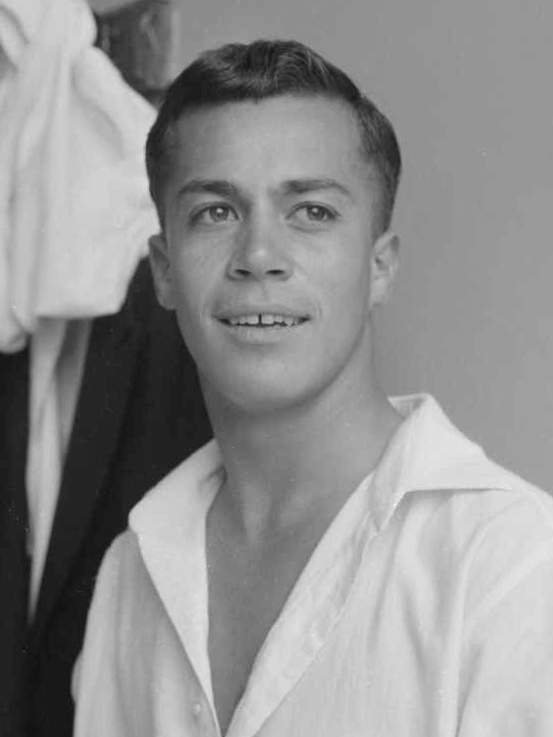
Rodney Reid

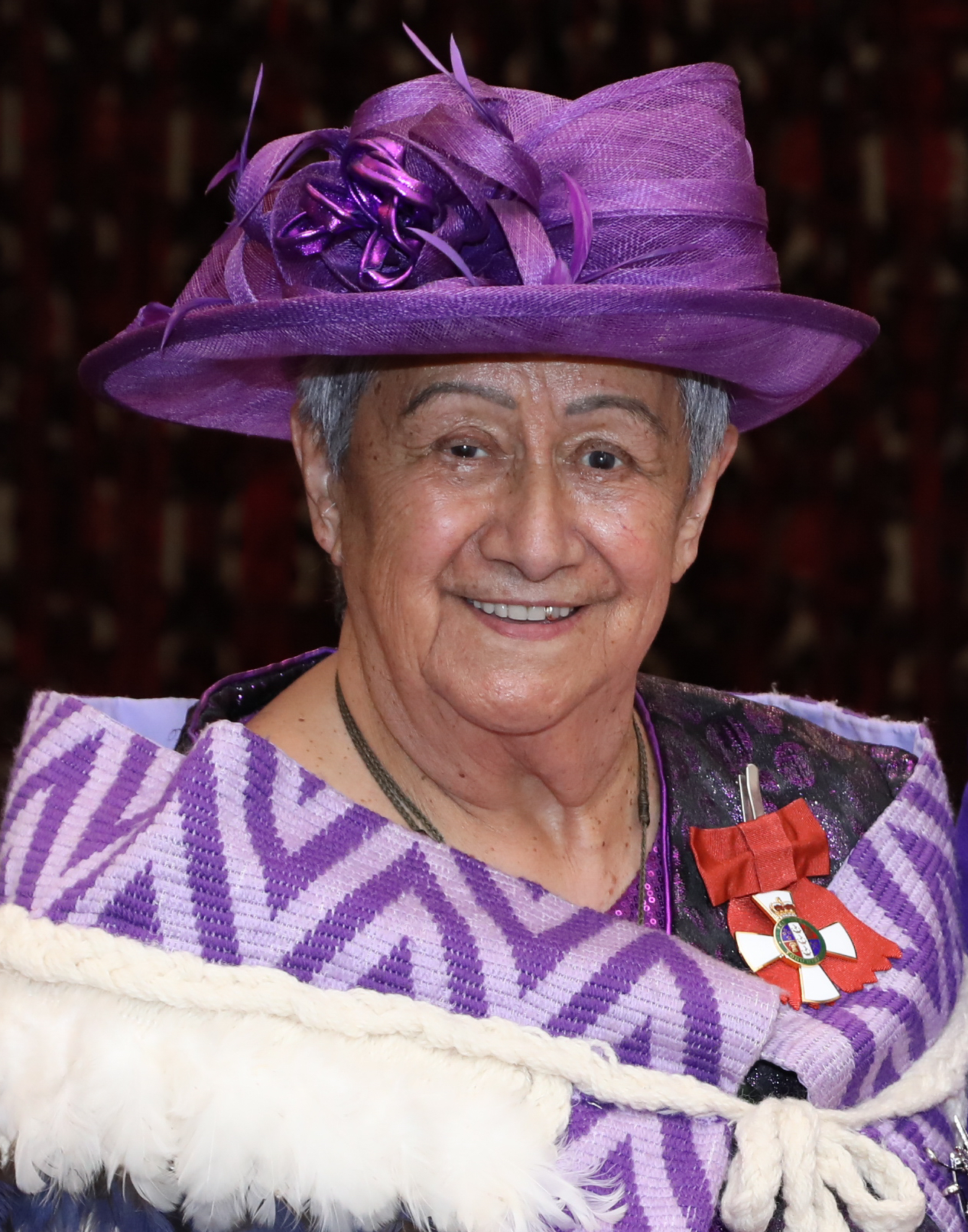
Dame Aroha Reriti‑Crofts

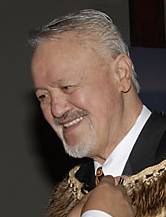
Joe Hawke

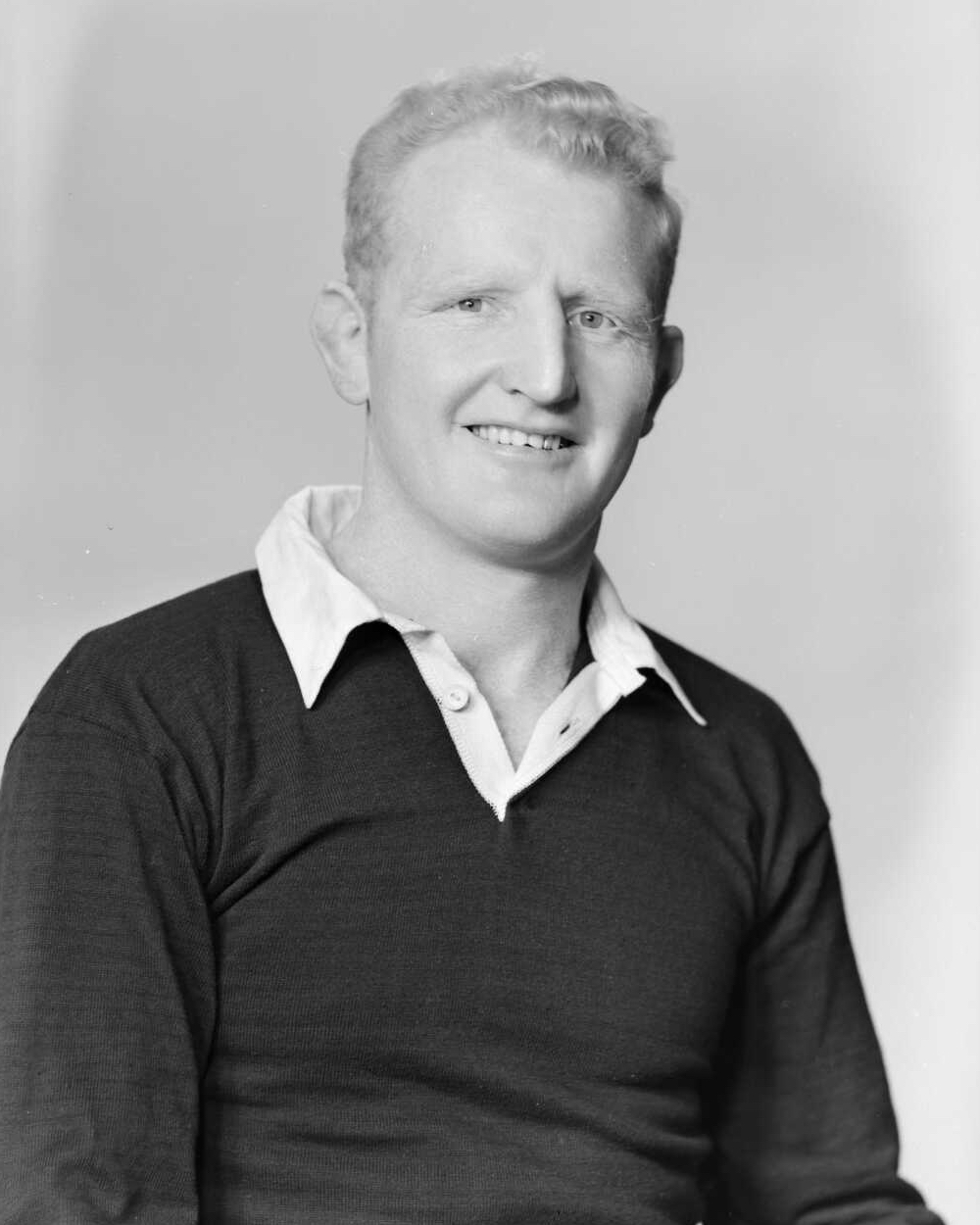
Dick Conway

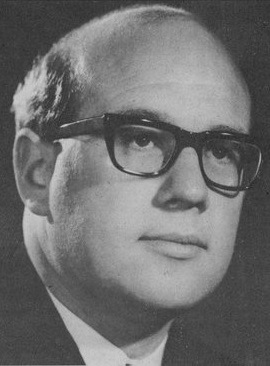
Stan Rodger

=== June ===
- 1 June
  - Katharine Bowden, family planning pioneer (born 1928).
  - Tom Johnson, rugby union player (Hawke's Bay), businessman, sports administrator, New Zealand Rugby Football Union council member (1973–1986) (born 1938).
- 5 June – Toby Autridge, jockey and horseracing trainer (born 1962).
- 8 June – Graeme Marsh, Hall of Fame businessman and philanthropist (born 1933).
- 10 June
  - Viliami Hingano, Tongan politician (born c. 1975).
  - Richard Prosser, politician. New Zealand First list MP (2011–2017) (born 1967).
- 12 June – Jim Campbell, rugby league player (Eastern Suburbs), coach and administrator; surf lifesaving administrator (born 1929).
- 16 June
  - Neil Fleming, educationalist (VARK model) (born 1939).
  - Don Neely, cricket historian, player (Wellington, Auckland) and administrator, president of New Zealand Cricket (2006–2009) (born 1935).
- 22 June – Donald Gemmell, Olympic (1956) and British Empire and Commonwealth Games (1958) rower (born 1932).
- 23 June – Rex Austin, politician, MP for Awarua (1975–1987) (born 1931).
- 25 June
  - Christine McElwee, local-body politician, historian and author, deputy mayor of Taupō (2001–2004, 2007–2009) (born 1946).
  - Russell Watt, rugby union player (Otago, Wellington, national team) (born 1935).
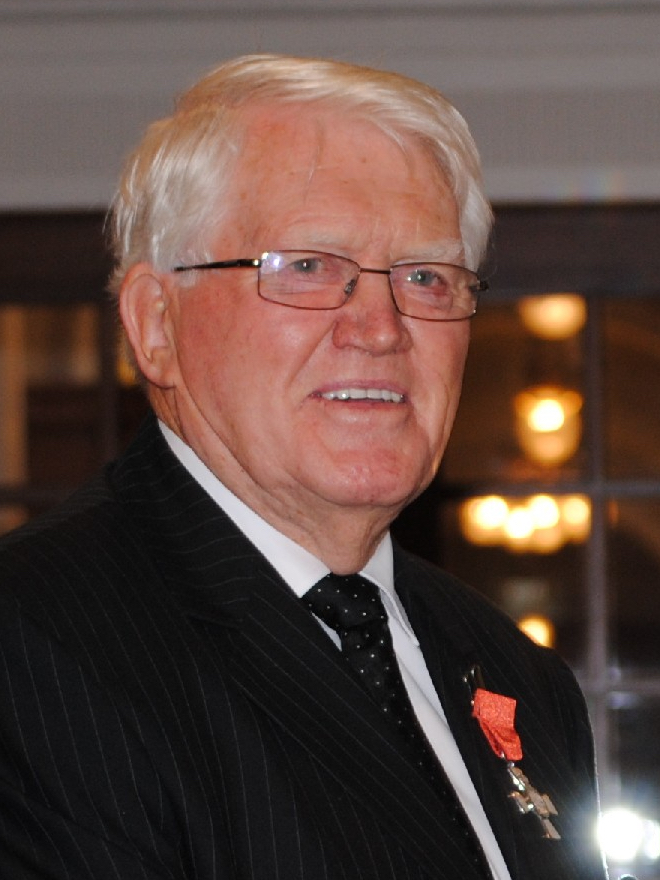
Tom Johnson

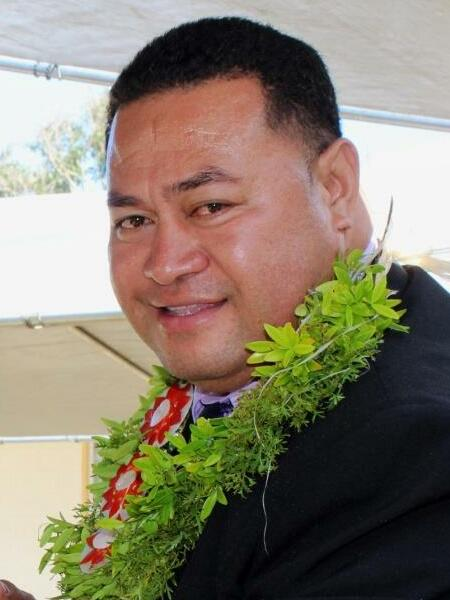
Viliami Hingano

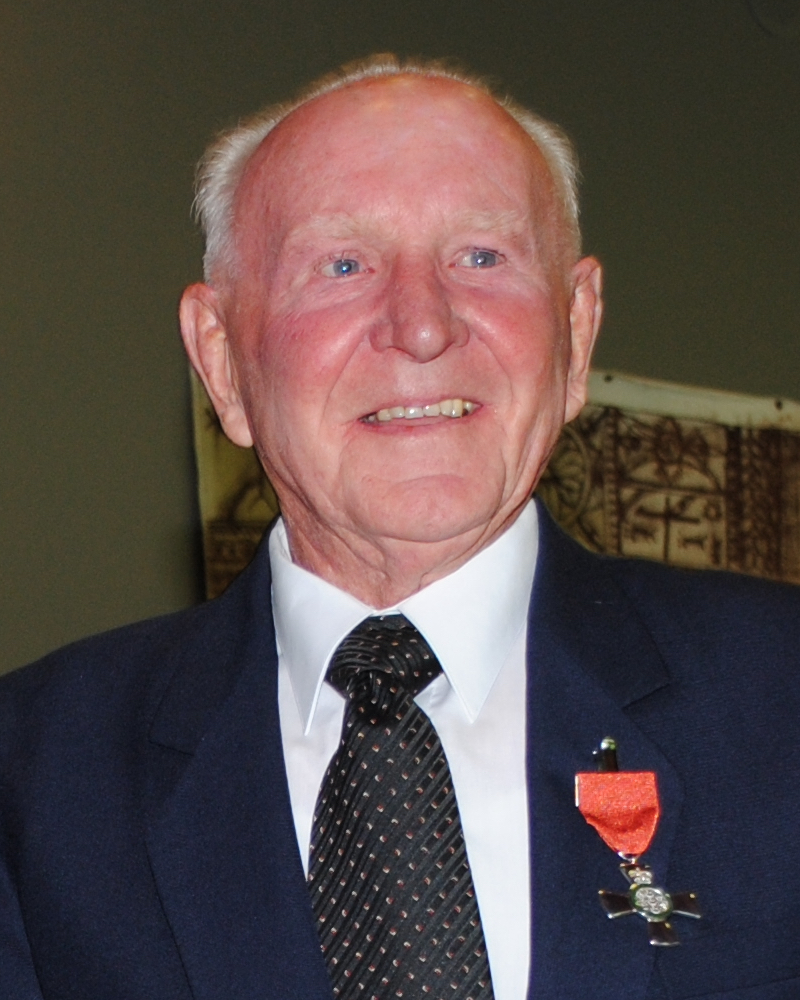
Jim Campbell

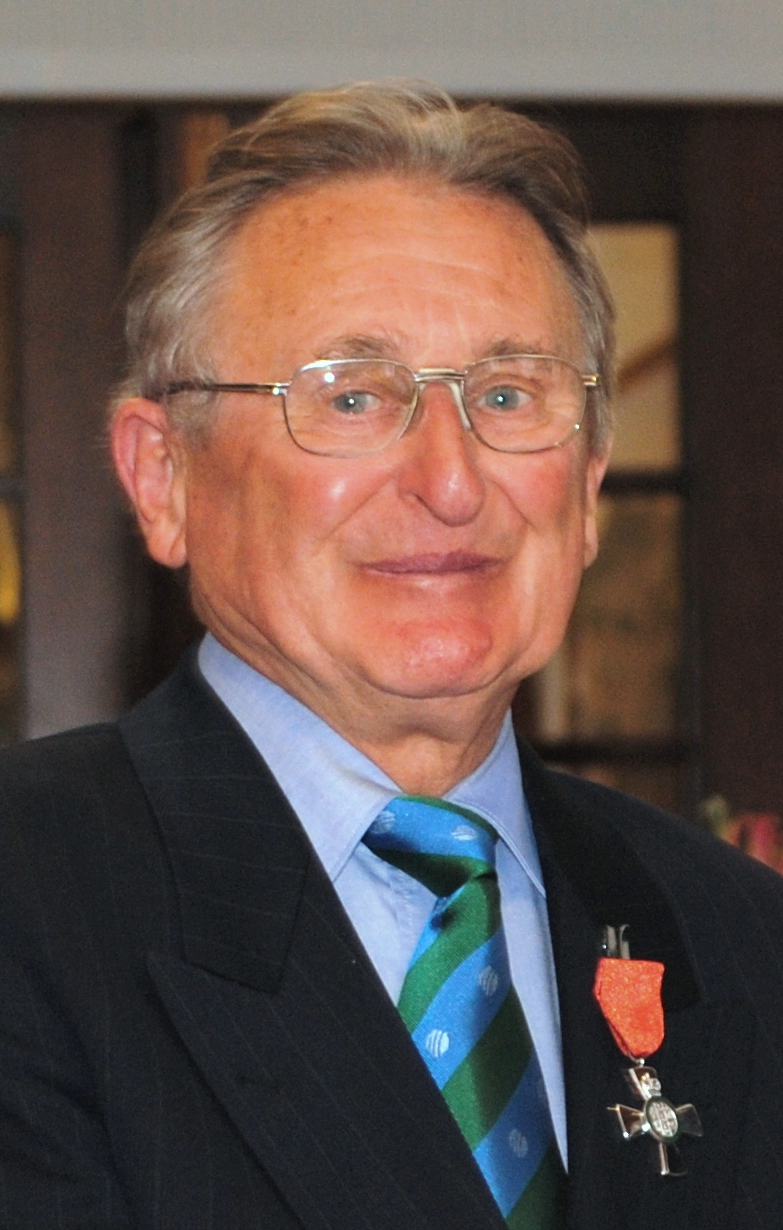
Don Neely

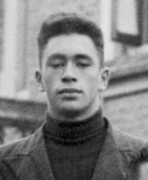
Rex Austin

=== July ===
- 3 July
  - Jack Monaghan, British Empire Games wrestler (1950) (born 1921).
  - Gavin Thorley, Olympic long-distance athlete (1972) (born 1947).
- 4 July – Richard Bradley, Māori leader (Rangitāne o Wairau) (born 1952).
- 9 July – Kevin Dawkins, legal academic (University of Otago) (born 1949).
- 10 July
  - Bill Crump, cricketer (Auckland) (born 1928).
  - Barry Sinclair, cricketer (Wellington, national team) (born 1936).
- 12 July
  - John Elliott, politician, MP for Whangarei (1975–1981) (born 1938).
  - Sir Michael Fowler, architect and local politician, mayor of Wellington (1974–1983) (born 1929).
  - Natalie Wicken, netball player (national team) (born 1930).
- 13 July – Bruce Cliffe, politician, MP for North Shore (1990–1996) (born 1948).
- 14 July – Ann Trotter, historian, University of Otago pro vice-chancellor (1993–1997) (born 1932).
- 16 July
  - Paul Cotton, public servant, diplomat and newspaper columnist (The Dominion), High Commissioner to Western Samoa (1975–1977), Ambassador to Greece (1980–1983) and the Philippines (1984–1988) (born 1930).
  - Pauline Stansfield, disability rights advocate (born 1939).
- 18 July
  - Alan Burnet, newspaper industry executive, Independent Newspapers managing director (1972–1983) and chair (1983–1993) (born 1921).
  - Ricky Houghton, Māori housing advocate and community leader, Local Hero of the Year (2018) (born 1960).
- 21 July – John Duggan, rugby union (Wakefield RFC) and rugby league player (Wakefield Trinity, Yorkshire) (born 1929).
- 23 July
  - Peter Bygate, public servant, acting Director-General of Conservation (1988, 1989–1990) (born 1933).
  - Geoff Geering, local politician, mayor of Ashburton (1977–1995) (born 1932).
- 27 July
  - John Grenell, country singer and songwriter ("I've Been Everywhere") (born 1944).
  - Inez Kingi, Māori health leader (born 1931).
  - Don Spary, helicopter pilot, tourism pioneer, and businessman, George Medal recipient (1975) (born 1931).
- 30 July – Don Hammond, rugby league player (Auckland, national team) and coach (Auckland) (born 1936).
- 31 July – Brian Molloy, rugby union player (Canterbury, national team), plant ecologist, and conservationist, Loder Cup (1990) (born 1930).
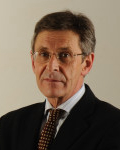
Kevin Dawkins

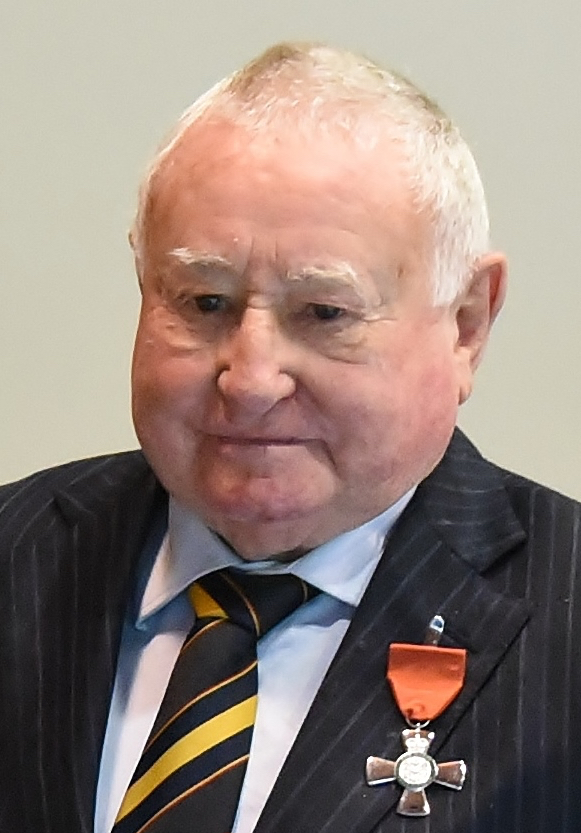
Barry Sinclair

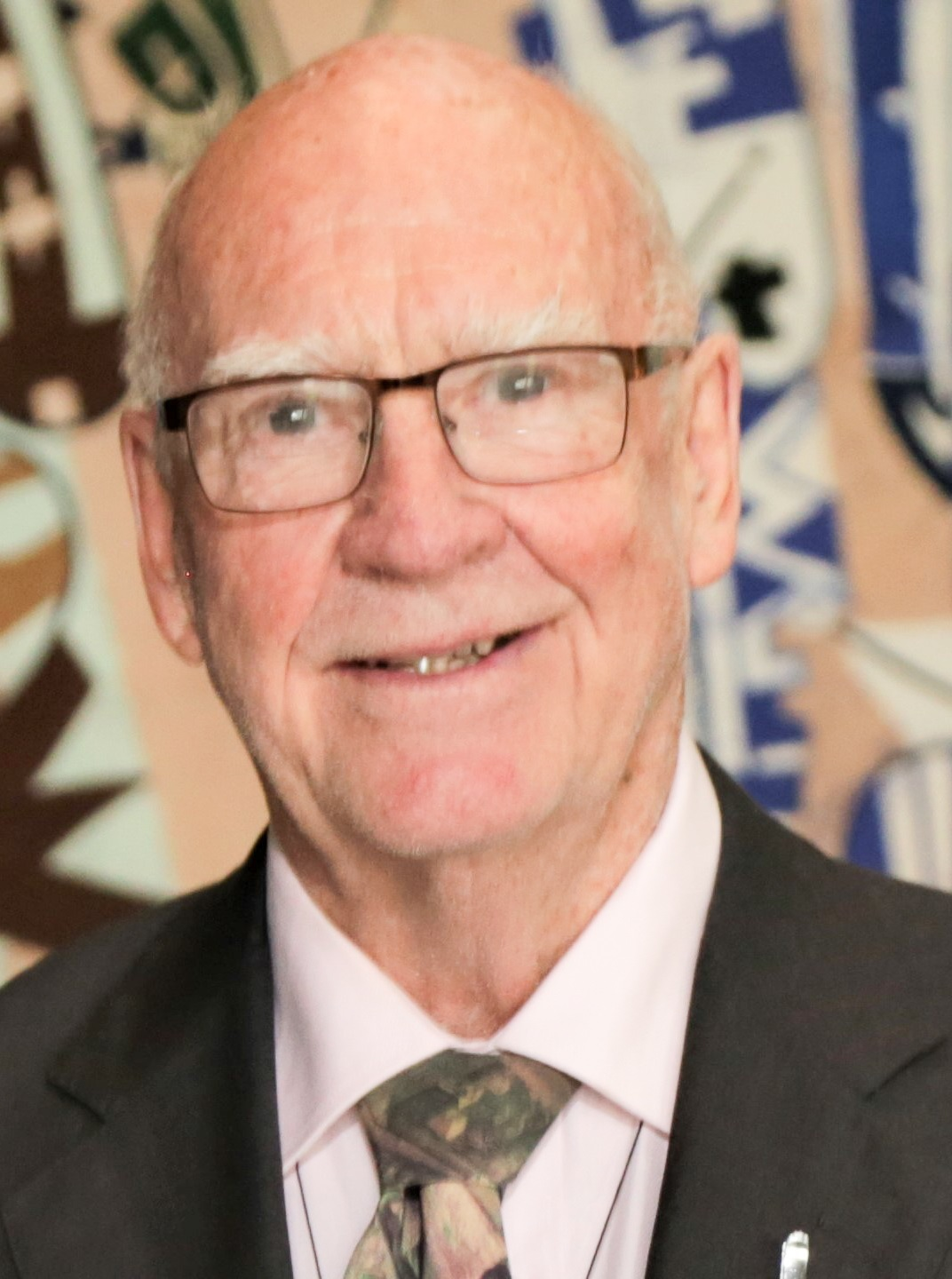
John Elliott

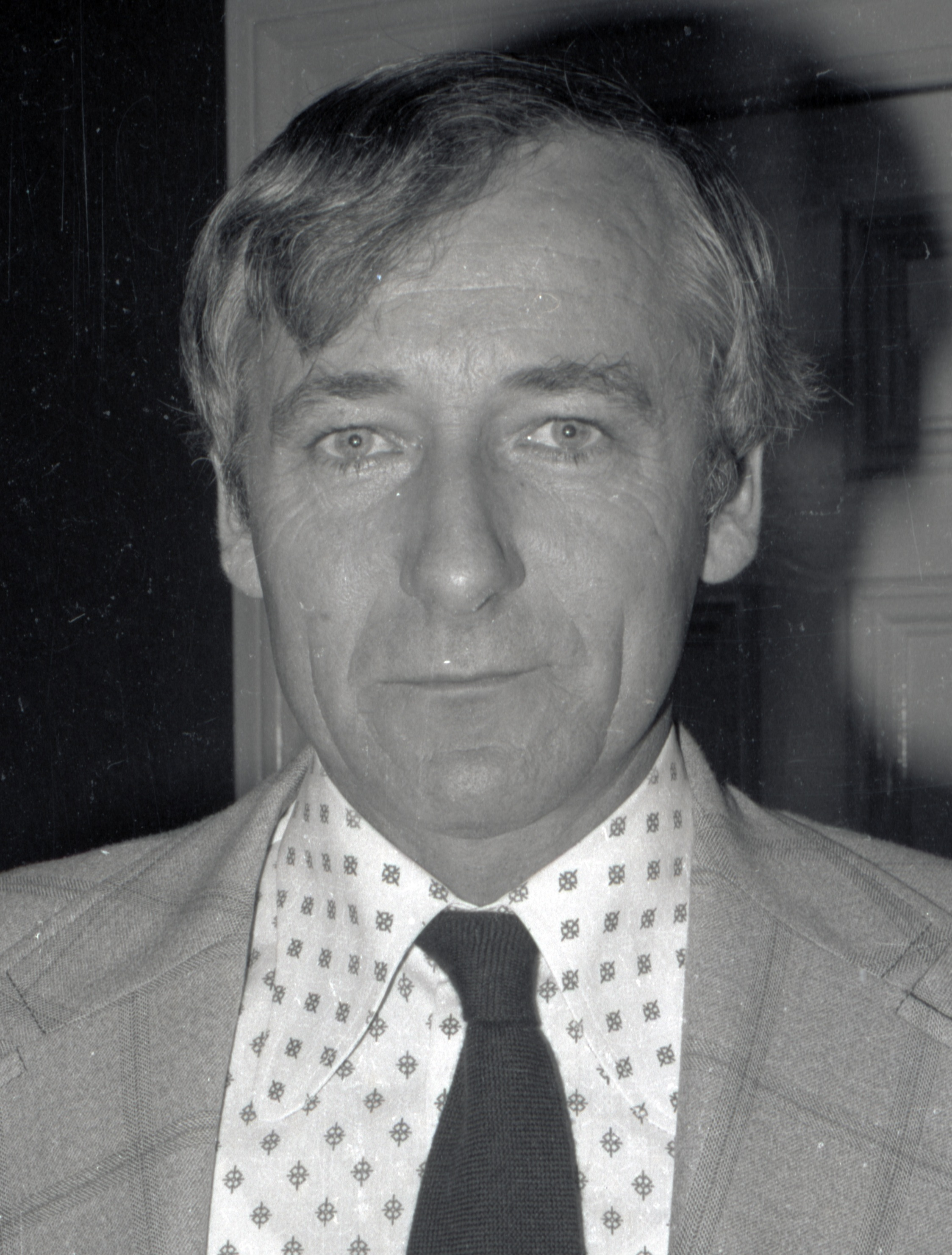
Sir Michael Fowler

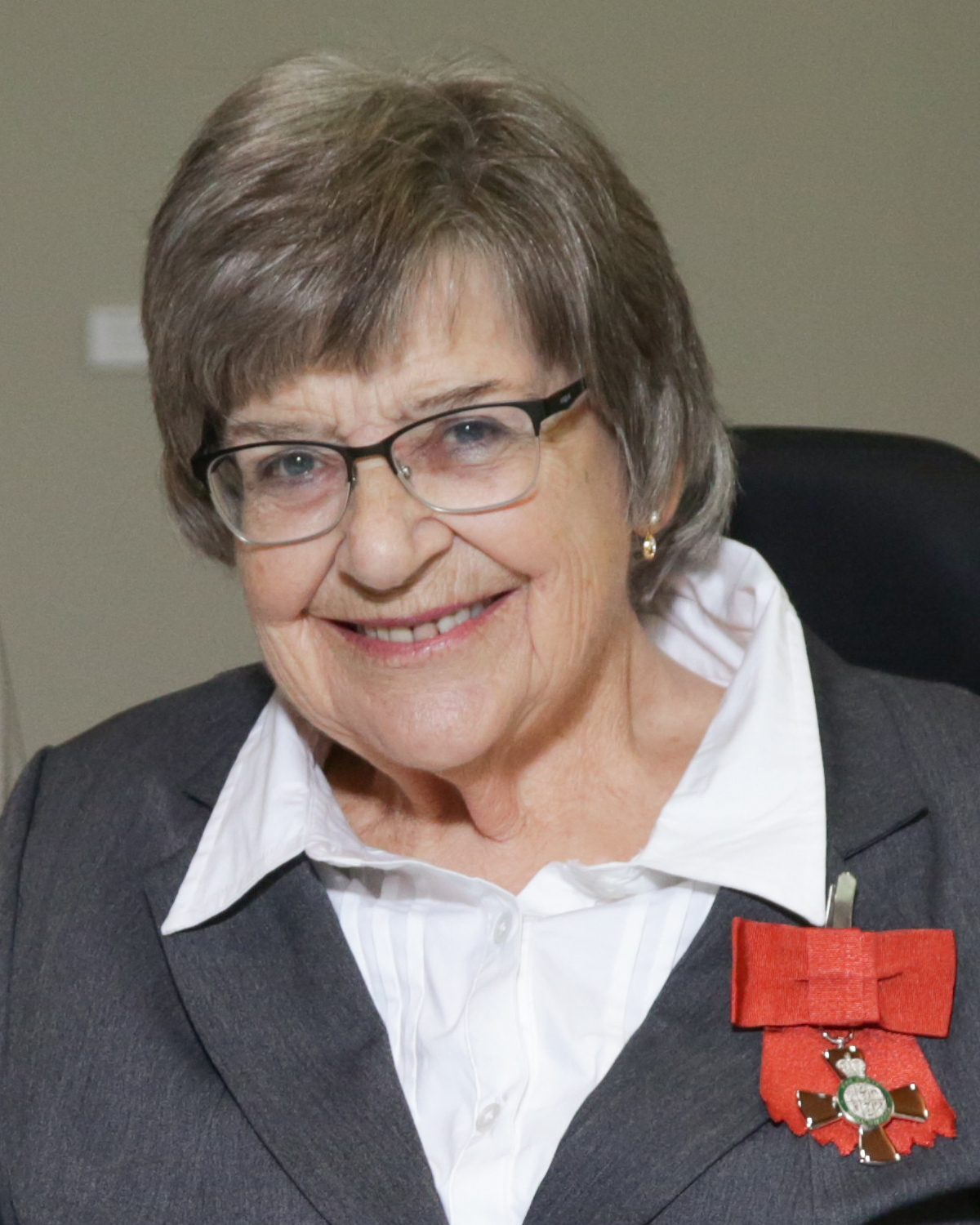
Pauline Stansfield

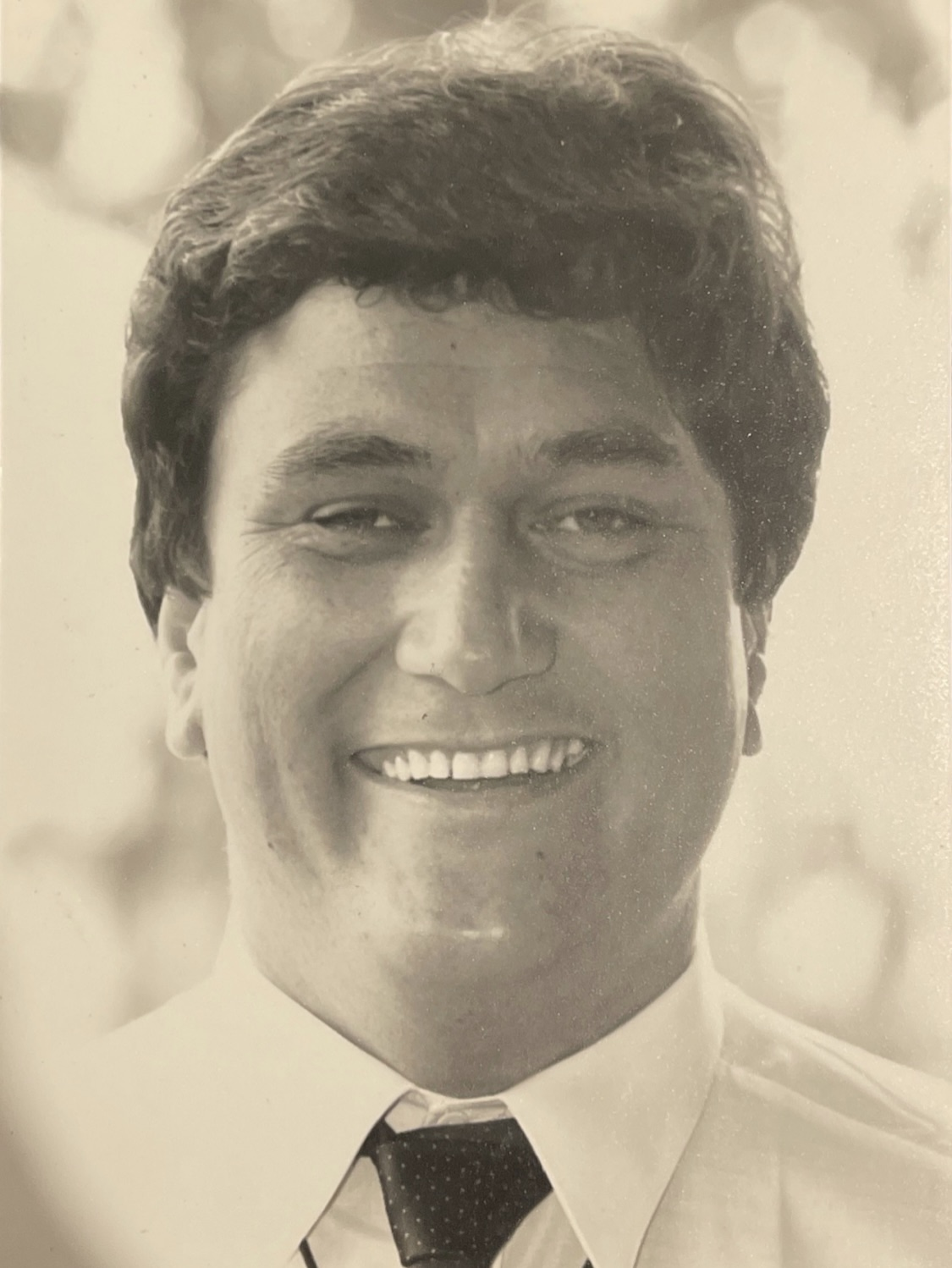
Ricky Houghton

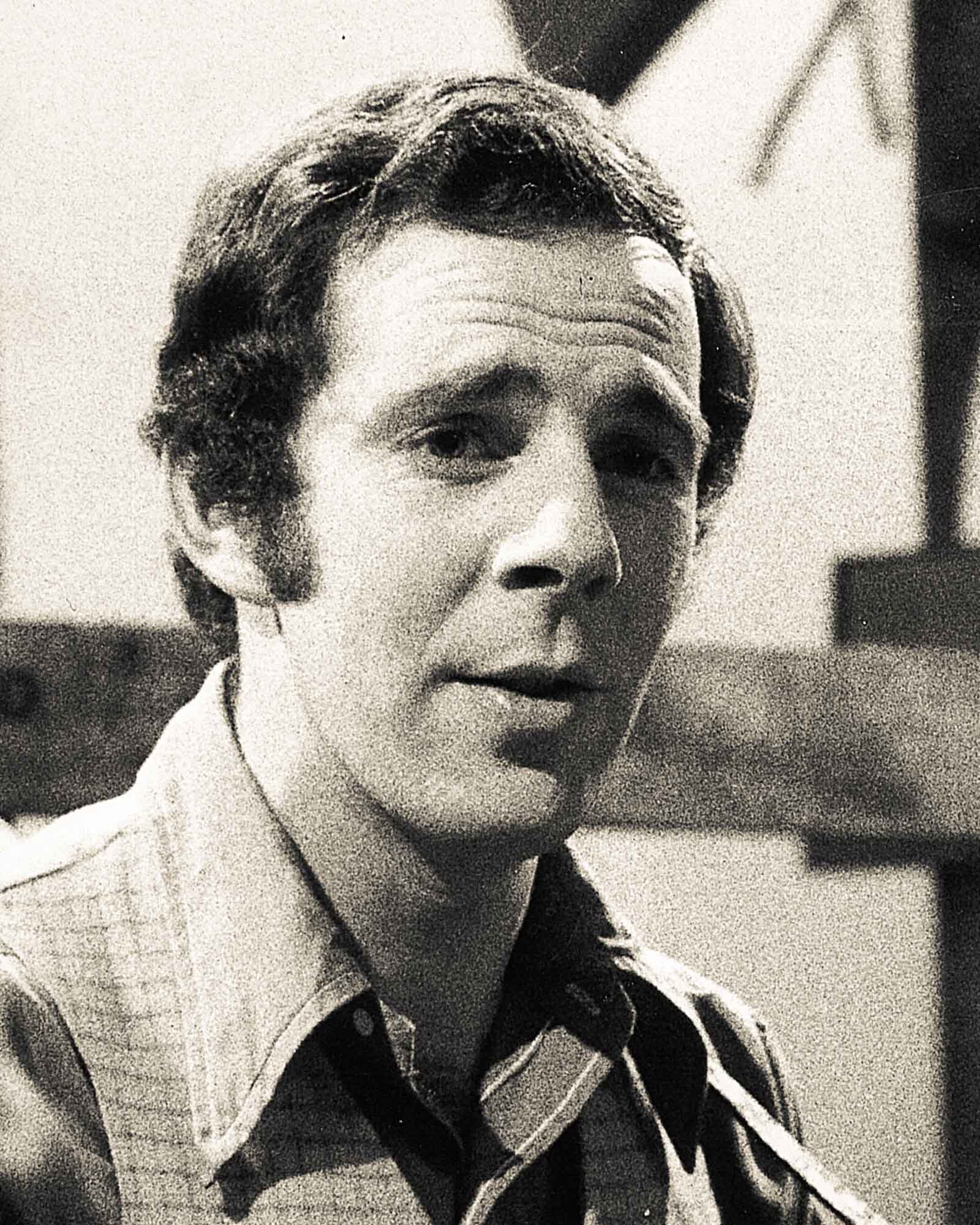
John Grenell

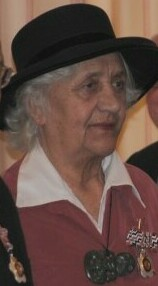
Inez Kingi

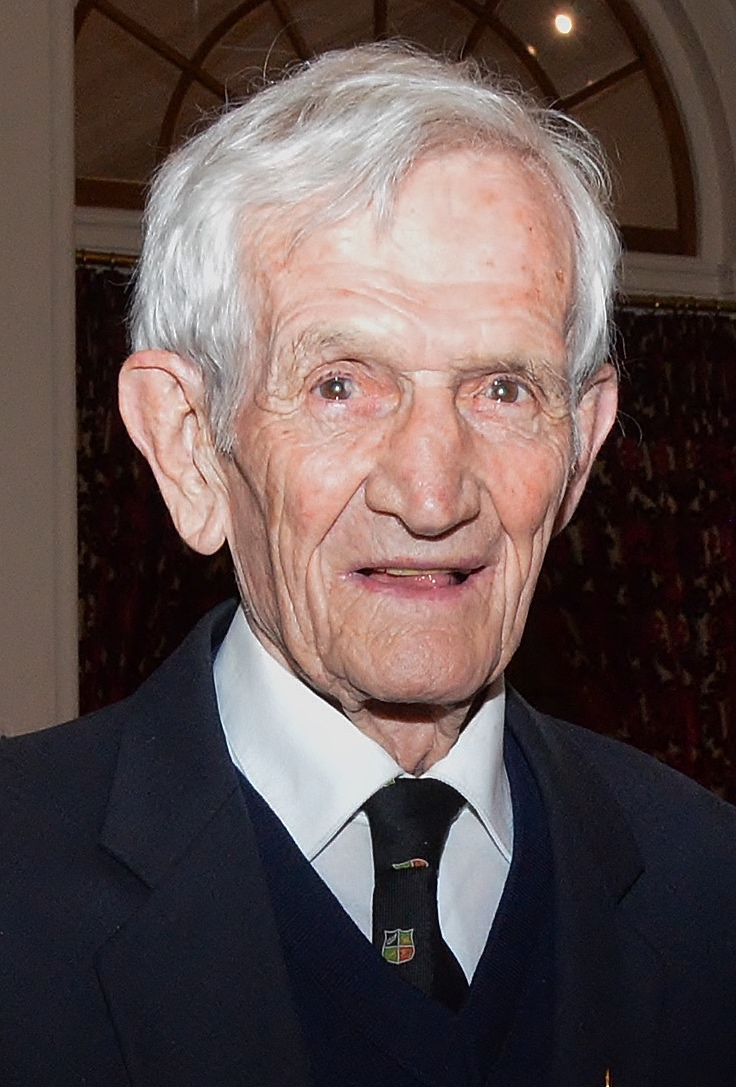
Brian Molloy

=== August ===
- 5 August – Mark Paterson, Olympic sailor (1976), Cherub world champion (1978), 470 World Championship bronze medallist (1977) (born 1947).
- 7 August – John Lawrence, ceramicist (born 1929).
- 9 August – Sir Miles Warren, architect (Christchurch Town Hall), NZIA Gold Medal (2000), Member of the Order of New Zealand (since 1995) (born 1929).
- 10 August – Jim Thomson, cricketer (Wellington) (born 1933).
- 11 August
  - Colleen Mills, management academic (University of Canterbury) (born 1955).
  - Martin Wilson, environmentalist and festival organiser (Cuba Street Carnival) (born 1959).
- 12 August – Jann Medlicott, radiographer and philanthropist, sponsor of the Acorn Prize for Fiction (since 2016) (born 1942).
- 14 August
  - Paul Hudson, businessman, local politician, Dunedin City Councillor (1989–2013) (born c. 1949).
  - Marshall Napier, actor (Came a Hot Friday, The Navigator, McLeod's Daughters) and playwright (born 1951).
- 15 August – Ioane King, actor (Spartacus) (born 1973).
- 17 August – Sir Toby Curtis, rugby union player (Counties, Bay of Plenty), Māori leader (Te Arawa), and educator, deputy vice-chancellor of Auckland University of Technology (2000–2005) (born 1939).
- 22 August – Margaret Urlich, Hall of Fame singer (Peking Man, When the Cat's Away), seven-time New Zealand Music Award winner (born 1965).
- 23 August – Julian Robertson, hedge fund manager (Tiger Management) and philanthropist (born 1932).
- 26 August – Roy Wilson, architect (Wellington Regional Stadium) (born 1946).
- 28 August – Gil Cawood, Olympic rower (1968), world championship bronze medallist (1970) (born 1939).
- 30 August – Sir Graeme Davies, metallurgist (University of Auckland, University of Cambridge, University of Sheffield) and universities administrator (Universities Funding Council, Higher Education Funding Council for England) (born 1937).
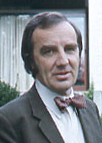
Sir Miles Warren

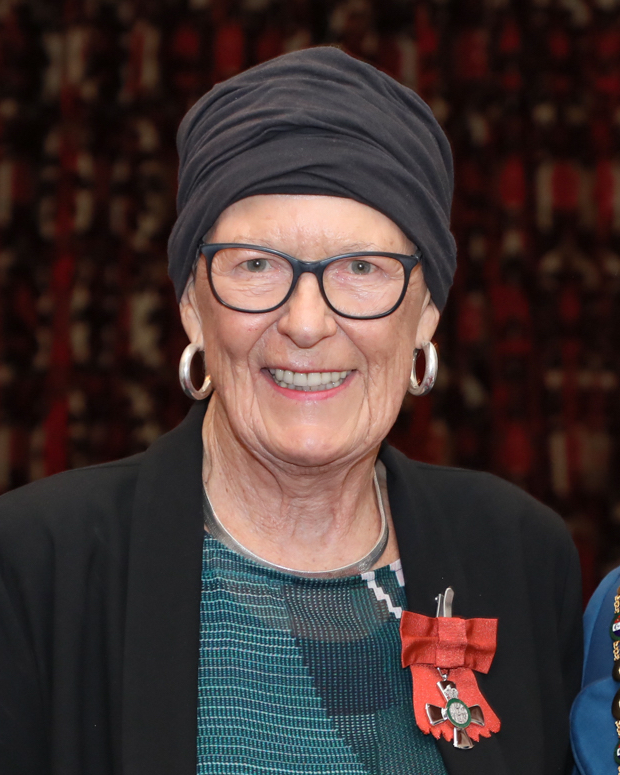
Jann Medlicott

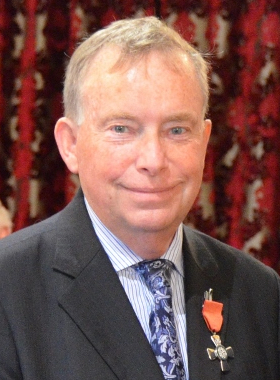
Paul Hudson

Sir Toby Curtis

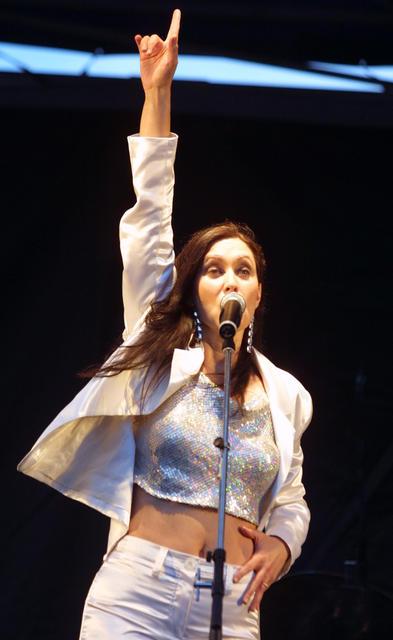
Margaret Urlich

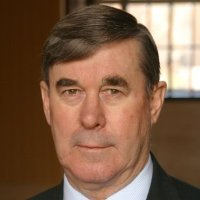
Sir Graeme Davies

=== September ===
- 1 September
  - Kim Goldwater, winegrower (Goldwater Estate) and philanthropist (born 1937).
  - Phillip Mann, science fiction writer (Master of Paxwax, The Fall of the Families) and theatre director (born 1942).
- 4 September – Peter Macdonald, geophysicist (DSIR), Antarctic research pioneer, Polar Medal (1958) (born 1926).
- 5 September – Jeff Robson, Hall of Fame badminton and tennis player, and badminton administrator, International Badminton Federation vice president, (1989–2004), Halberg lifetime achievement award (2004) (born 1926).
- 7 September – Willie Losʻe, rugby union player (North Harbour, Auckland, Tonga national team) and broadcaster (born 1967).
- 8 September – Elizabeth II, Queen of New Zealand (since 1952) (born 1926).
- 11 September – David McIntyre, historian (University of Canterbury) (born 1932).
- 12 September – Dick Littlejohn, Hall of Fame rugby union administrator, co-chair of the 1987 Rugby World Cup organising committee (born 1931).
- 14 September – Ken Douglas, trade union leader, New Zealand Council of Trade Unions president (1987–1999), Member of the Order of New Zealand (since 1998) (born 1935).
- 15 September – Maanu Paul, Māori leader (Ngāti Awa), New Zealand Māori Council co-chair (born 1938).
- 25 September – Leslie Swindale, soil scientist (Soil Bureau, University of Hawaiʻi, Food and Agriculture Organization) (born 1928).
- 26 September – Gordon Dryden, educationalist and broadcaster, founder of Radio Pacific (born 1931).
- 28 September – Oonah Shannahan, netball player (national team) (born 1921).
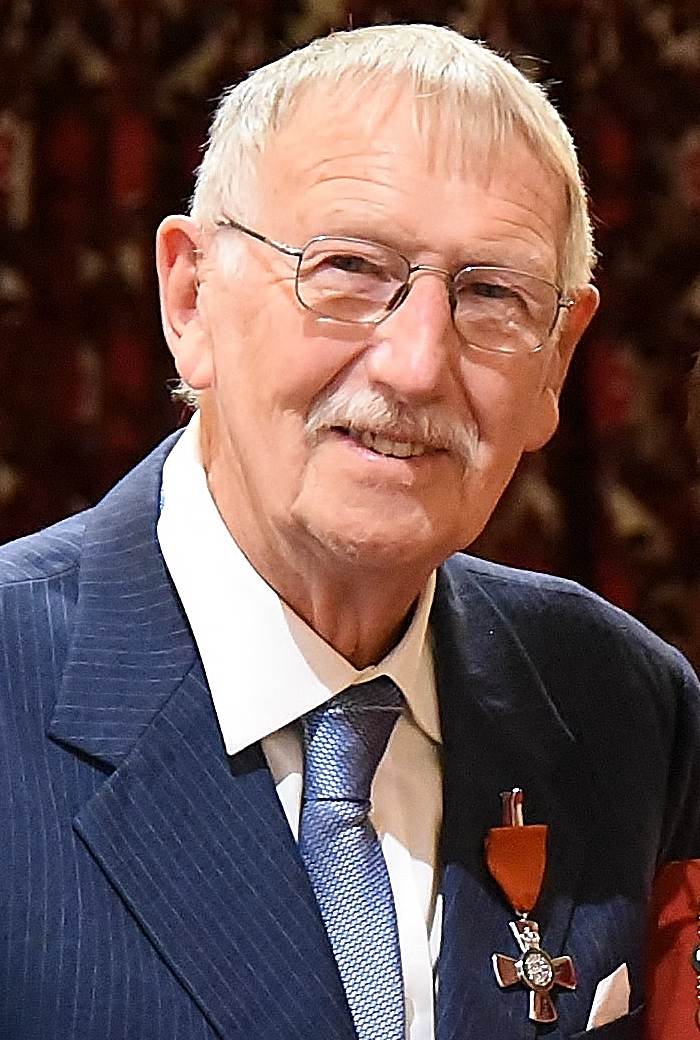
Phillip Mann

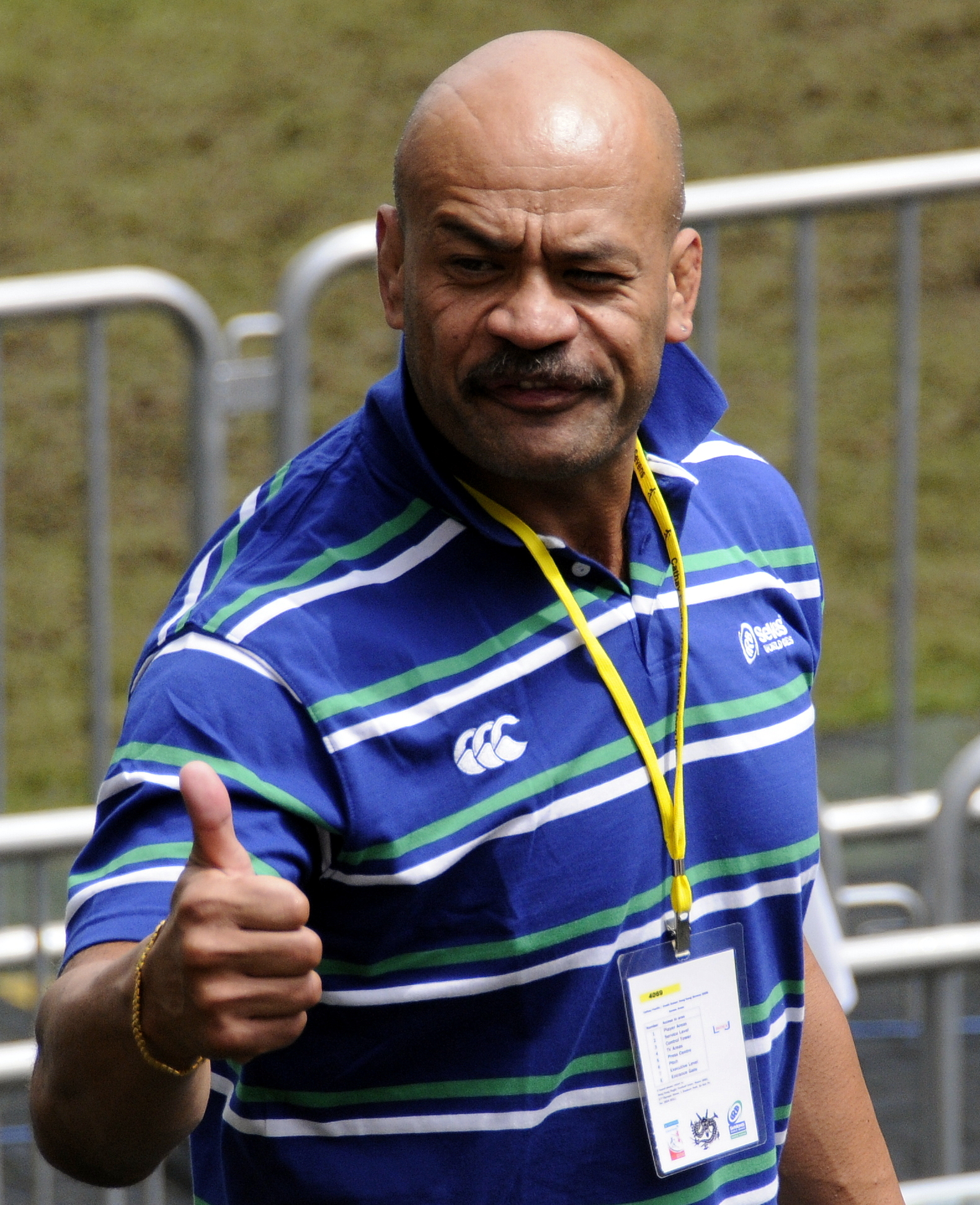
Willie Losʻe

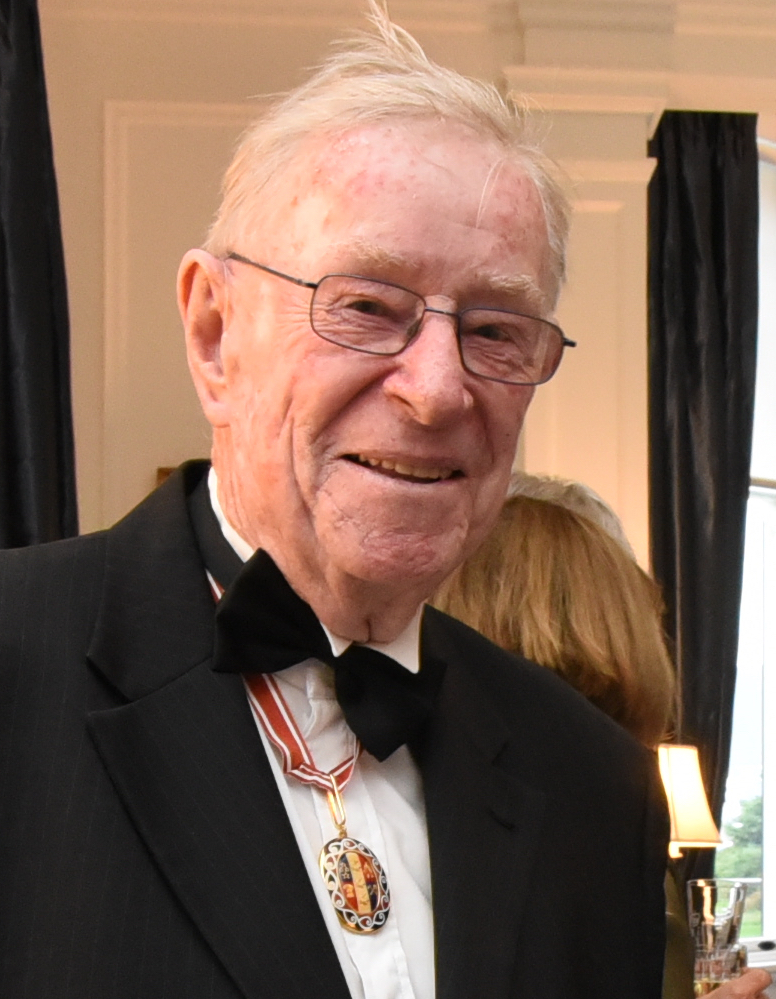
Ken Douglas

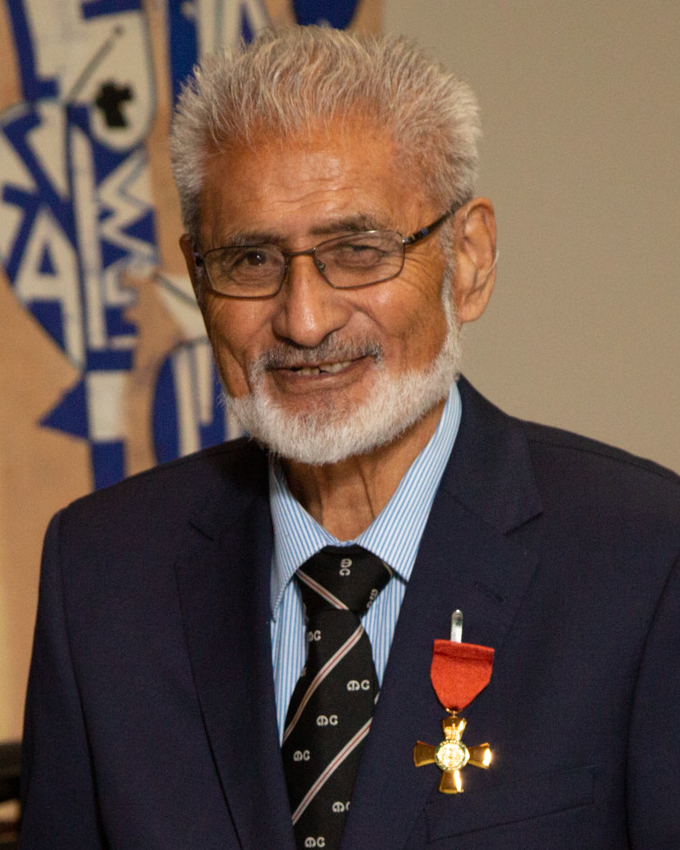
Maanu Paul

=== October ===
- 2 October – Jim Carter, Hall of Fame musician ("Blue Smoke") (born 1919).
- 6 October – Mary Ogg, local politician, mayor of Gore (1995–2001) (born c. 1945).
- 9 October – Bruce Pairaudeau, cricketer (Northern Districts, West Indies) (born 1931).
- 11 October
  - Joan Fear, painter (born 1932).
  - Graeme Shadwell, civil engineer and public servant, Commissioner of Works (1985–1988), Te Papa design and construction project director (1988–1998) (born 1933).
- 15 October – Margaret Farry-Williams, fashion leader and fundraiser (born 1933).
- 23 October – Robert Nola, philosophy academic (University of Auckland), Fellow of the Royal Society of New Zealand (2009–2022) (born 1940).
- 25 October – Farquhar Wilkinson, cellist, New Zealand Symphony Orchestra principal cello (1955–1992) (born 1932).
- 27 October – Terry Ryan, expert on Ngāi Tahu genealogy (born 1942).
- 30 October – Shane Reed, Aquathlon world champion (1998, 1999, 2004) and Olympic triathlete (2008) (born 1973).
- 31 October – Eddie Robertson, geophysicist and scientific administrator, Director-General of the DSIR (1971–1980), Fellow of the Royal Society of New Zealand (since 1963) (born 1919).
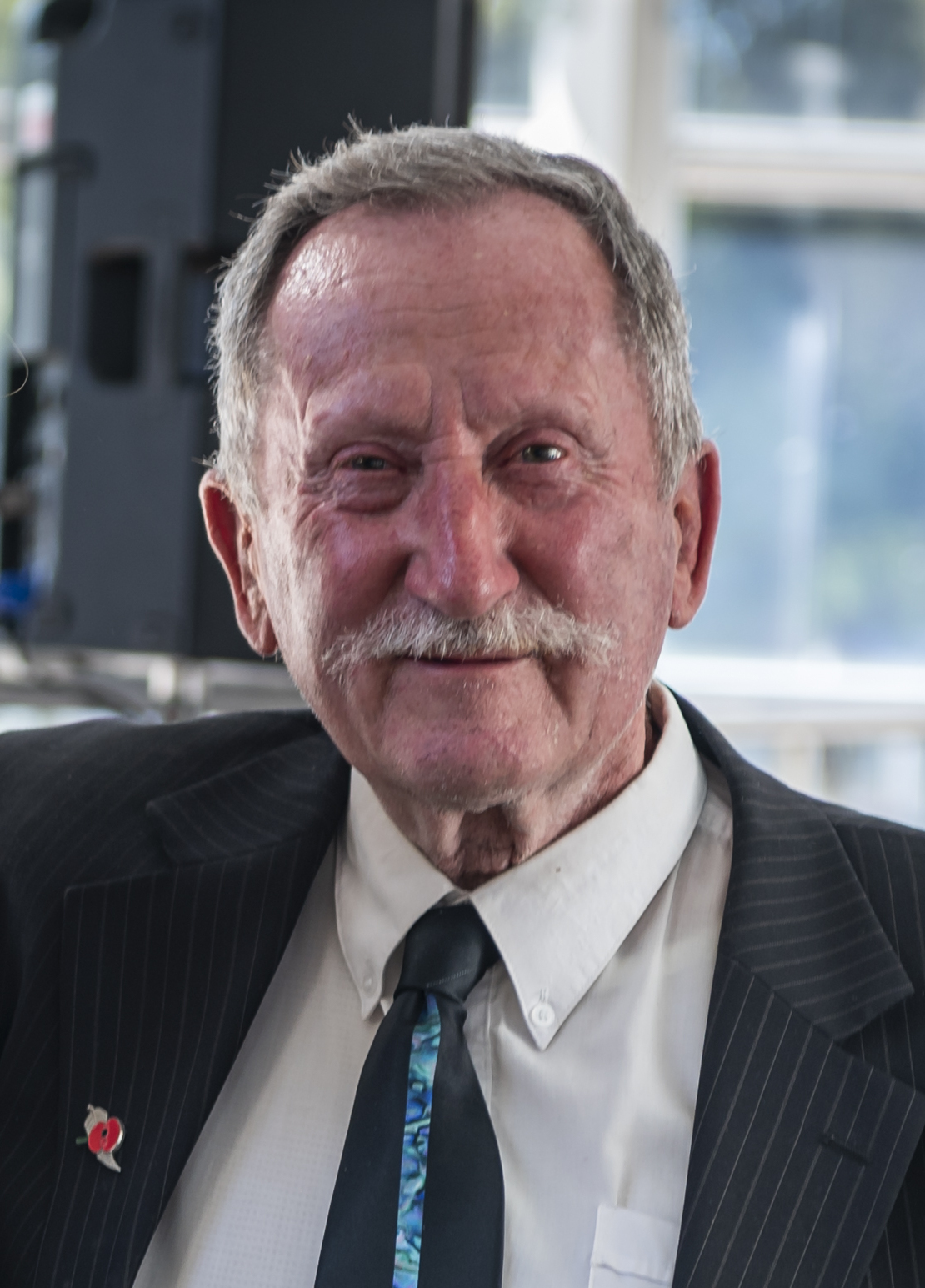
Terry Ryan

=== November ===
- 3 November – Starcraft, Hall of Fame Thoroughbred racehorse, Australian Derby (2004), Queen Elizabeth II Stakes (2005), Prix du Moulin de Longchamp (2005), Australian Champion Three Year Old (2003–04) (foaled 2000).
- 4 November – John Warrington, cricketer (Auckland, Northern Districts) and association footballer (Worcester City) (born 1948).
- 6 November – John Alderson, cricketer (Canterbury) (born 1929).
- 7 November
  - Sir Roger Bhatnagar, businessman (Noel Leeming) and philanthropist (born 1942).
  - Kevin Hart, sports broadcaster (born c. 1947).
- 9 November – Han Klisser, baker and businessman (Vogel's bread) (born 1927).
- 11 November – Sir Ian Barker, jurist, King's Counsel (since 1973), judge of the High Court (1976–1997), chancellor of the University of Auckland (1991–1999) (born 1934).
- 12 November – Susan Wakefield, tax accountant and philanthropist (Ravenscar House Museum), chair of the Commerce Commission (1989–1994) (born 1942).
- 14 November – Geoff Cochrane, poet, novelist, short-story writer, Arts Foundation of New Zealand Laureate (2014) (born 1951). (death announced on this date)
- 18 November
  - Dick Johnstone, Olympic (1964) and British Empire and Commonwealth Games (1958, 1962) cyclist (born 1936).
  - Lawrence Jones, literary scholar (University of Otago), Fellow of the Royal Society of New Zealand (since 2009).
  - Neil MacLean, judge and coroner, District Court judge (1993–2014), Chief Coroner (2007–2015) (born 1944).
- 20 November – Lesley Elliott, domestic violence prevention campaigner, Supreme Woman of Influence (2014) (born 1946).
- 22 November – Gary Blackman, pharmacologist (University of Otago), photographer and artist (born 1929).
- 27 November
  - Audrey Eagle, botanical illustrator, Loder Cup (1985) (born 1925).
  - Hamish Kilgour, Hall of Fame musician (The Clean, Bailter Space) (born 1957). (on or about this date)
  - Sir Allan Wright, farming leader, businessman and sports administrator, president of Federated Farmers (1977–1981), chancellor of Lincoln University (1986–1994), president of New Zealand Cricket (1993–1994) (born 1929).
- 28 November – Jenny McLeod, composer (Hōhepa) and musical theorist (Victoria University of Wellington) (born 1941).
- 29 November – Gray Nelson, public servant and diplomat (born 1927).
- 30 November
  - Glynne Adams, violist, NZBC Symphony Orchestra principal viola (c. 1962–1966) (born 1928).
  - Sir Murray Halberg, Hall of Fame middle-distance athlete, Olympic (1960) and British Empire and Commonwealth Games (1958, 1962) champion, charity founder, Member of the Order of New Zealand (since 2008) (born 1933).
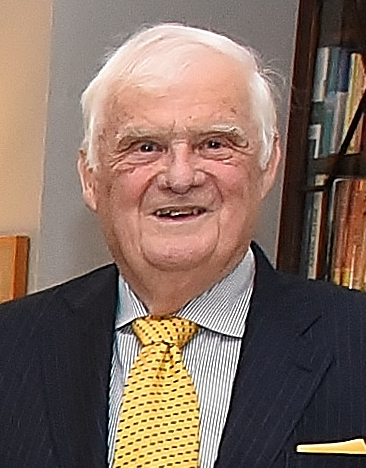
Sir Ian Barker

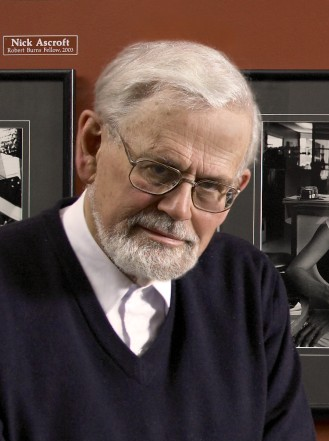
Lawrence Jones

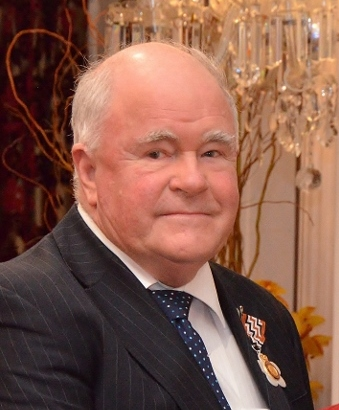
Neil MacLean

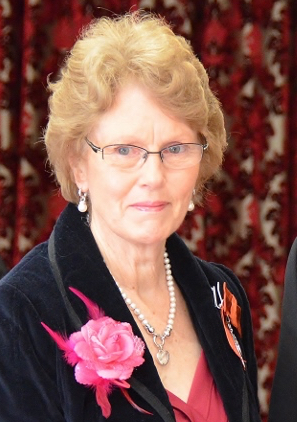
Lesley Elliott

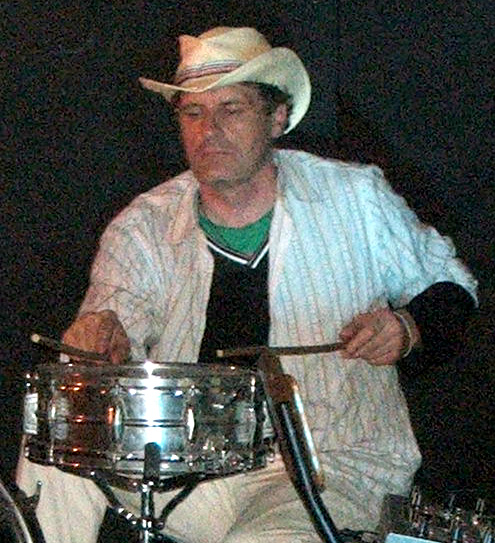
Hamish Kilgour

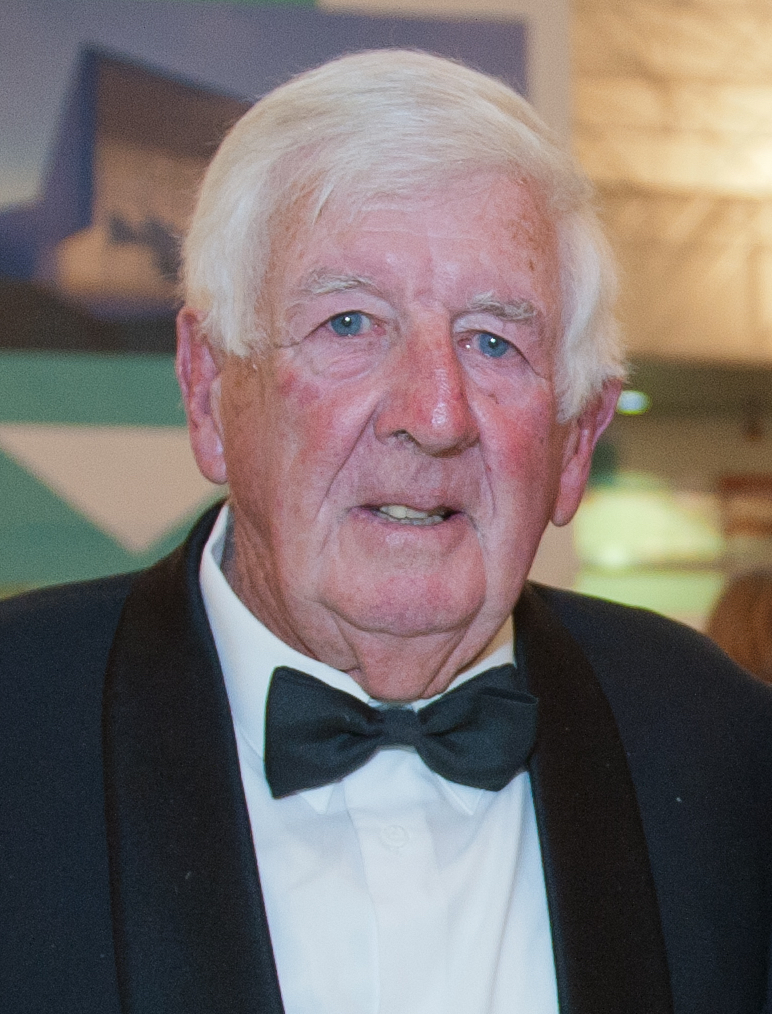
Sir Allan Wright

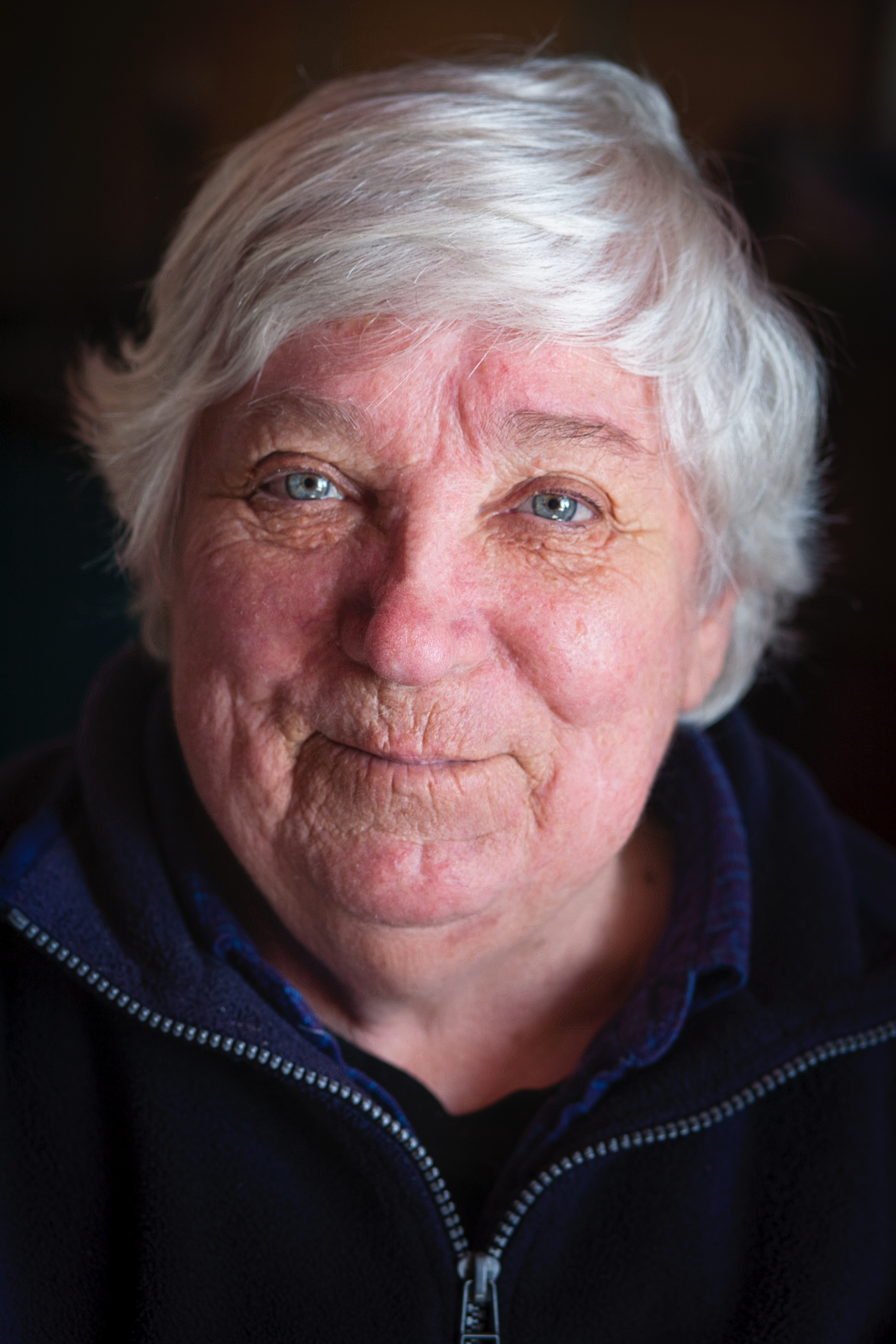
Jenny McLeod

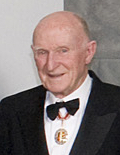
Sir Murray Halberg

=== December ===
- 3 December – Annemarie Hope-Cross, photographic artist.
- 8 December – Ian Hunter, naval officer, Chief of Naval Staff (1991–1994) (born 1939).
- 10 December
  - John Armstrong, journalist, political editor of The New Zealand Herald (1989–2003) (born 1954).
  - John Fogarty, jurist, King's Counsel (since 1990), District Court judge (2003–2017) (born 1947).
  - Colin Gibson, professor of English (University of Otago), hymn writer (born 1933).
- 11 December – Bruce J. McFarlane, Australian economist (University of Adelaide) (born 1936).
- 12 December – Hilary McCormack, deaf community advocate (born 1934).
- 13 December – Vern Clark, animal scientist (Lincoln University) (born 1923).
- 17 December
  - Nau Epiha, Māori leader (Ngāpuhi, Ngāti Kura) (born 1942).
  - Dale Harrop, ice hockey player (Canterbury Red Devils, West Auckland Admirals, national team) (born 1989).
  - Ann Stephens, Hall of Fame squash player, and badminton player (born 1933).
- 19 December – Sandy Edmonds, singer (born 1948).
- 23 December
  - Colin Jillings, Hall of Fame Thoroughbred horse racing trainer (McGinty, Uncle Remus) (born 1931).
  - Claire McLintock, haematologist and obstetric physician, president of the International Society on Thrombosis and Haemostasis (2018–2020) (born 1965).
- 30 December – Terence O'Brien, diplomat, Permanent Representative to the United Nations in New York (1990–1993), President of the United Nations Security Council (March 1993) (born 1936).
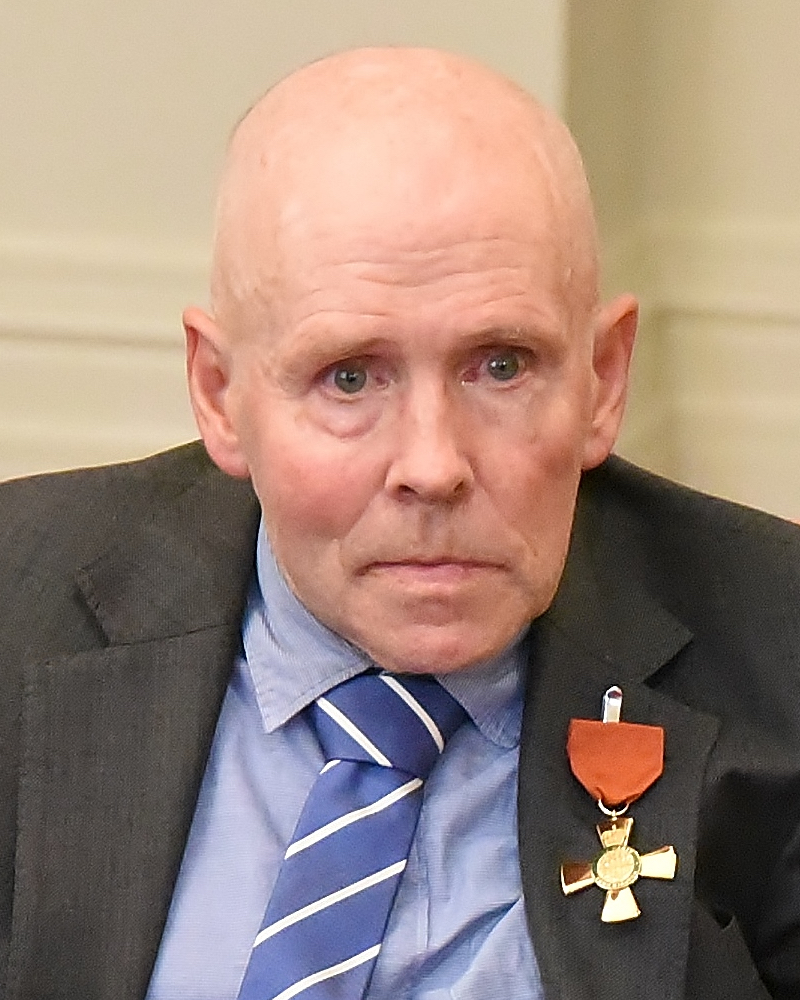
John Armstrong

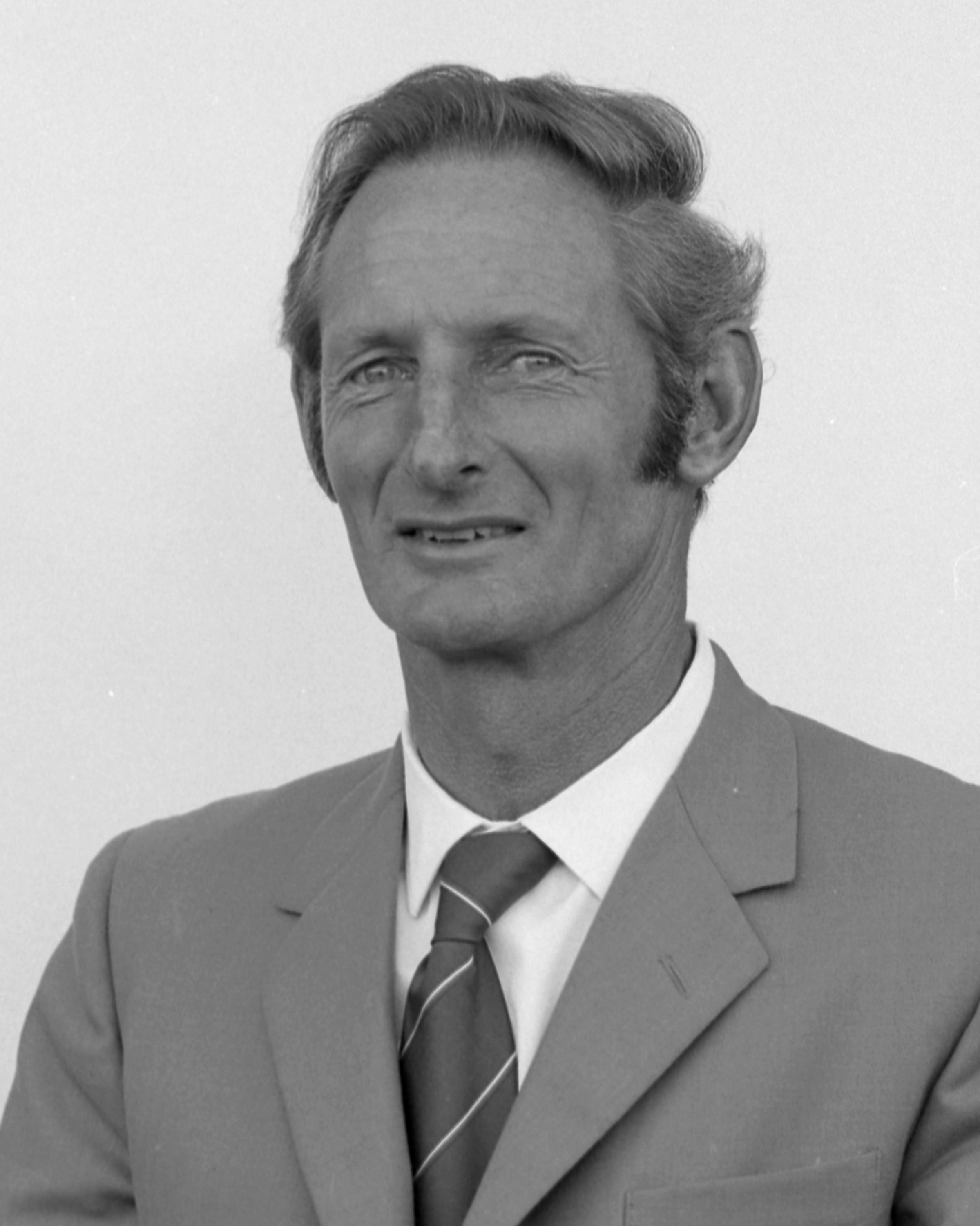
Vern Clark

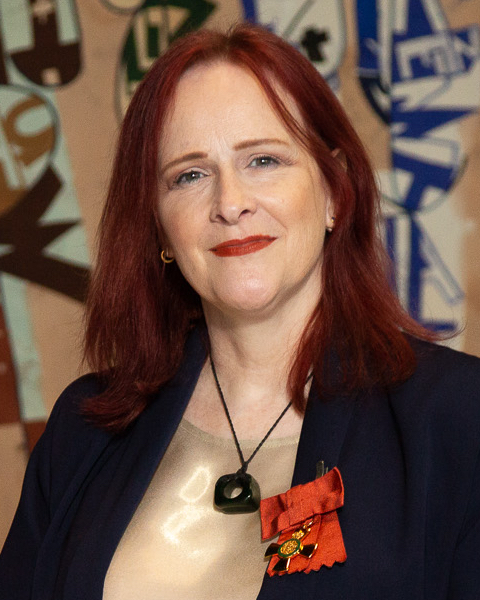
Claire McLintock

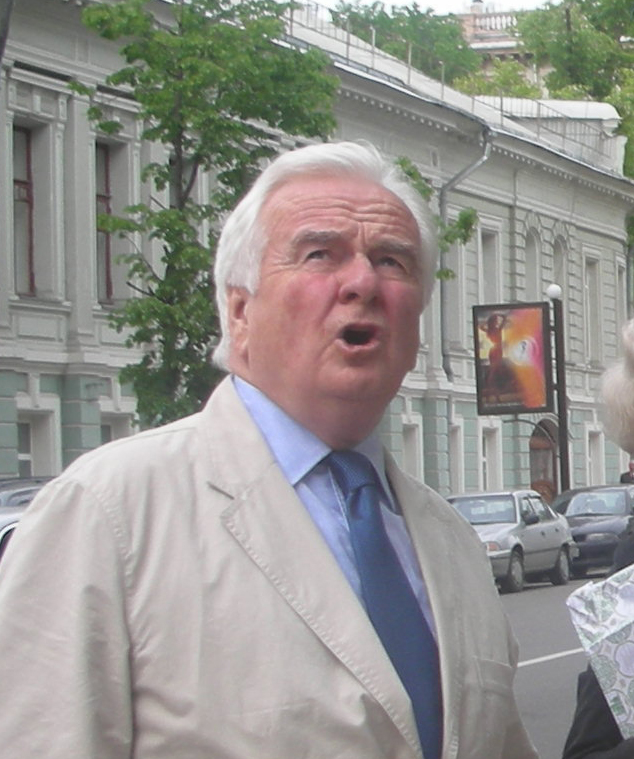
Terence O'Brien
