= List of honorary doctors of Victoria University of Wellington =

Victoria University of Wellington has conferred the following honorary doctorates:

Year	Recipient	Degree
1963	Walter Nash	LLD
1964	John Ilott	LLD
1965	Ernest Marsden	DSc
1966	Keith Holyoake	LLD
1966	John Llewellyn	LLD
1966	Harold Miller	LitD
1967	Charles Fleming	DSc
1967	Rex Mason	LLD
1968	John Beaglehole	LitD
1968	Thurgood Marshall	LLD
1968	James Williams	LLD
1969	Guy Powles	LLD
1969	Richard Wild	LLD
1970	C. E. Beeby	LitD
1970	Edmund Hillary	LLD
1971	William Liley	DSc
1971	Philip Patrick Lynch	LLD
1971	Duncan Stout	LLD
1972	Rewi Alley	LitD
1973	Arthur Tyndall	LLD
1974	Vincent Aspey	DMus
1975	Denis Glover	LitD
1975	Jack Marshall	LLD
1975	Gwen Somerset	LLD
1976	Monte Holcroft	LitD
1976	Masiofo Laulu Fetauimalemau Mataʻafa	LLD
1976	Richard Spence Volkmann Simpson	LLD
1977	Ian Drummond Campbell	LLD
1977	Bruce Mason	LitD
1978	Thaddeus McCarthy	LLD
1978	John O'Shea	LitD
1978	Owen Woodhouse	LLD
1979	Graham Bagnall	LitD
1979	Eruera Riini Mānuera	LitD
1979	Whakaari Te Rangitakuku Mete-Kingi	LLD
1979	Holmes Miller	DSc
1979	Hēnare Ngata	LLD
1980	Walter Scott	LitD
1980	Kazimierz Wodzicki	DSc
1981	James Munro Bertram	LitD
1983	Doug Anthony	LLD
1983	Robert Burchfield	LitD
1983	Peter de la Mare	DSc
1983	Daniel Brumhall Cochrane Taylor	LLD
1983	Gillian Weir	DMus
1984	Henry Lang	LLD
1984	Kevin Benjamin O'Brien	LLD
1984	Ron Trotter	LLD
1985	John Ziman	DSc
1986	Wiremu Parker	LitD
1987	George Paterson Barton	LLD
1987	Sonja Davies	LLD
1987	Maurice Gee	LitD
1987	Peter Whittle	DSc
1988	Malcolm McCaw	LLD
1988	Ian Ambury Miller Prior	DSc
1989	Robin Cooke	LLD
1989	Patricia Grace	LitD
1989	Paul Reeves	LLD
1989	Ivor Richardson	LLD
1990	Raymond Boyce	LitD
1990	Eddie Durie	LLD
1990	John Hickman	DSc
1990	Erihapeti Rehu-Murchie	LLD
1990	W. H. Oliver	LitD
1990	Ieremia Tabai	LLD
1991	Doreen Blumhardt	LitD
1991	John Douglas Fraser	LLD
1991	Trevor Hatherton	DSc
1991	John Mansfield Thomson	DMus
1992	Colin Aikman	LLD
1992	John McGrath	LLD
1992	Janet Paul	LitD
1993	Geraldine McDonald	LitD
1993	Frances Porter	LitD
1993	Margaret Sparrow	DSc
1993	Mira Szászy	LLD
1994	Poul Gnatt	LitD
1995	Douglas Gray	LitD
1995	Václav Havel	LitD
1995	Bill Robinson	DSc
1996	Neil Ashcroft	DSc
1996	Roger Hall	LitD
1996	Rose Pere	LitD
1997	Michael Hardie Boys	LLD
1997	Michael King	LitD
1997	Donald McKenzie	LitD
1997	Elizabeth Orr	LitD
1998	Thomas Eichelbaum	LLD
1998	Les Holborow	LLD
1998	Miria Simpson	LitD
1999	Ian Axford	DSc
1999	Alistair Te Ariki Campbell	LitD
1999	Jane Campion	LitD
1999	Roderick Deane	LLD
1999	Ken Douglas	LLD
1999	Alan MacDiarmid	DSc
1999	Aung San Suu Kyi	LLD
1999	Te Atairangikaahu	LLD
2000	Ian Athfield	LitD
2001	Denis Adam	LitD
2001	Alexander Malahoff	DSc
2002	Gordon H. Brown	LitD
2002	Lyell Cresswell	DMus
2002	Michael Kelly	DSc
2002	George Laking	LLD
2002	Geoffrey Palmer	LLD
2002	Kara Puketapu	LLD
2002	David J. Stevenson	DSc
2003	Jacquie Baxter	LitD
2003	Glenn Schaeffer	LitD
2003	Gillian Whitehead	DMus
2003	Leslie Young	DCom
2003	Alison Quentin-Baxter	LLD
2003	Tīmoti Kāretu	LitD
2004	David Caygill	DCom
2004	Koro Dewes	LitD
2004	Ian Gordon	LitD
2004	Frank Holmes	DCom
2004	Witi Ihimaera	LitD
2004	Albert F. A. L. Jones	DSc
2004	Kenneth Keith	LLD
2004	Roy McKenzie	DCom
2004	Richard Taylor	LitD
2004	Fran Wilde	LitD
2005	Judith Christine Hanratty	LLD
2005	Shayle R. Searle	DSc
2005	Fran Walsh	LitD
2005	Albert Wendt	LitD
2005	Frank Corner	LLD
2005	Geoff Robinson	LitD
2006	Peter Hogg	LLD
2006	Michael Jackson	LitD
2006	Tipene O'Regan	DCom
2006	Lee Seng Tee	LitD
2006	Kiri Te Kanawa	DMus
2006	Jeremy Commons	DLitt
2006	Gordon Moller	DLitt
2006	Iritana Tāwhiwhirangi	DLitt
2007	Fleur Adcock	DLitt
2007	John Daniel Barnett	DCom
2007	John Clarke	DLitt
2007	Wade Francis Bruce Thompson	DCom
2007	Christopher John Rutherford Robertson	DSc
2008	Colin James	DLitt
2008	David John Mullan	LLD
2008	Richard Nunns	DMus
2008	Bernard Julius Spolsky	DLitt
2009	Richard Carey	DCom
2009	Graham Malaghan	DSc
2009	Alan Ward	LLD
2010	Donald Akenson	DLitt
2010	Paul Callaghan	DSc
2011	Bob Buckley	DSc
2011	Michael Houstoun	DMus
2012	Tuila'epa Sa'ilele Malielegaoi	LLD
2013	Paul Baines	DCom
2013	Rob Cameron	DCom
2014	Eleanor Catton	DLitt
2014	Roger Clark	LLD
2014	Jock Phillips	DLitt
2015	Halim Saad	DCom
2016	Kim Workman	DLitt
2016	Simon O'Neill	DMus
2016	Tuiloma Neroni Slade	LLD
2017	Moana Jackson	LLD
2017	Gregory O'Brien	DLitt
2017	Patsy Reddy	LLD
2018	Terence Arnold	LLD
2018	Bill English	DCom
2019	Emma Kruse Va'ai	DLitt
2019	Margaret Bazley	LLD
2019	James Belich	DLitt
2019	Gillian Greer	DLitt
2019	Matiu Te Rei	LLD
2020	Chris Finlayson	LLD
2020	Elizabeth Knox	DLitt
2020	Lyn Provost	DCom
2022	Paul Healy	DCom
2023	Robert Wade	DCom
2023	Christina Inglis	LLD
2023	Mark Dunajtschik	DCom
2023	Rangi Mātāmua	DLitt
2024	Te Ripowai Higgins	DLitt
2024	Pou Temara	DLitt
2024	Peter Hughes	DLitt
2025	Winnie Laban	DLitt
2025	David Carruthers	LLD
2025	Theresa Gattung	DCom
