= 1958 Special Honours (New Zealand) =

Awards list

The 1958 Special Honours in New Zealand were two special honours lists in which 26 New Zealanders were awarded the Polar Medal. The first list, issued on 22 May 1958, recognised 18 people for their services as members of the Commonwealth Trans-Antarctic Expedition, while the second list, published on 9 October 1958, gave recognition to a further eight people for their services as members of the New Zealand International Geophysical Year party to Antarctica.

== Polar Medal ==
=== Commonwealth Trans-Antarctic Expedition ===
- Harry Herbert Ayres – of Christchurch.
- Dr Ronald Walter Balham – of Wellington.
- James Gordon Bates – of Morrinsville.
- Ernest Selwyn Bucknell – of Days Bay.
- Roy Albert Carlyon – of Aramoho.
- Squadron Leader John Richard Claydon – Royal New Zealand Air Force; of Christchurch.
- Flying Officer William Joseph Cranfield – Royal New Zealand Air Force; of Christchurch.
- Murray Hamilton Douglas – of Christchurch.
- Murray Roland Ellis – of Dunedin.
- John Edward Gawn – of Wellington.
- Bernard Maurice Gunn – of Christchurch.
- Flight Lieutenant Gordon Haslop – Royal Air Force; serving in the United Kingdom.
- Sir Edmund Percival Hillary KBE – of Auckland.
- Wallace George Lowe OBE – of Hastings.
- Joseph Holmes Miller – of Masterton.
- Chief Radio Electrician Peter David Mulgrew – Royal New Zealand Navy; of Lower Hutt.
- Sergeant Laurence Walter Tarr – Royal New Zealand Air Force; of Thames.
- Guyon Warren – of Christchurch.
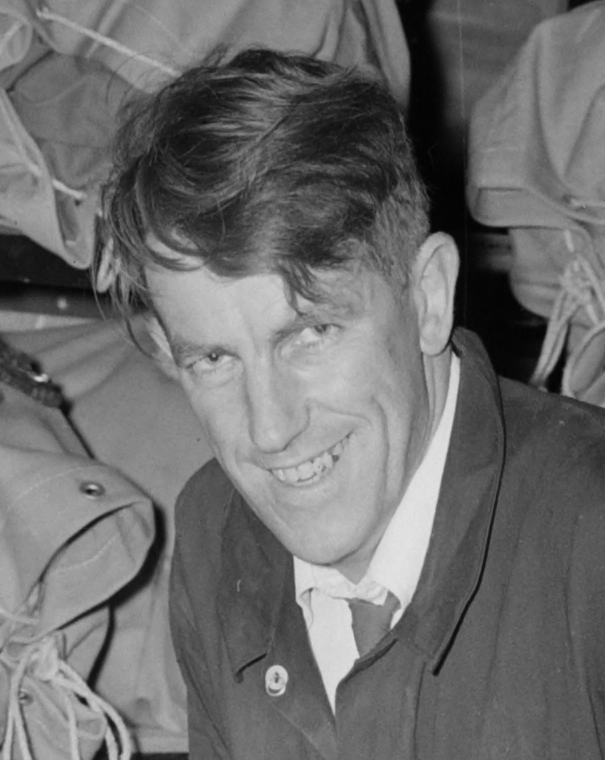
Sir Edmund Hillary

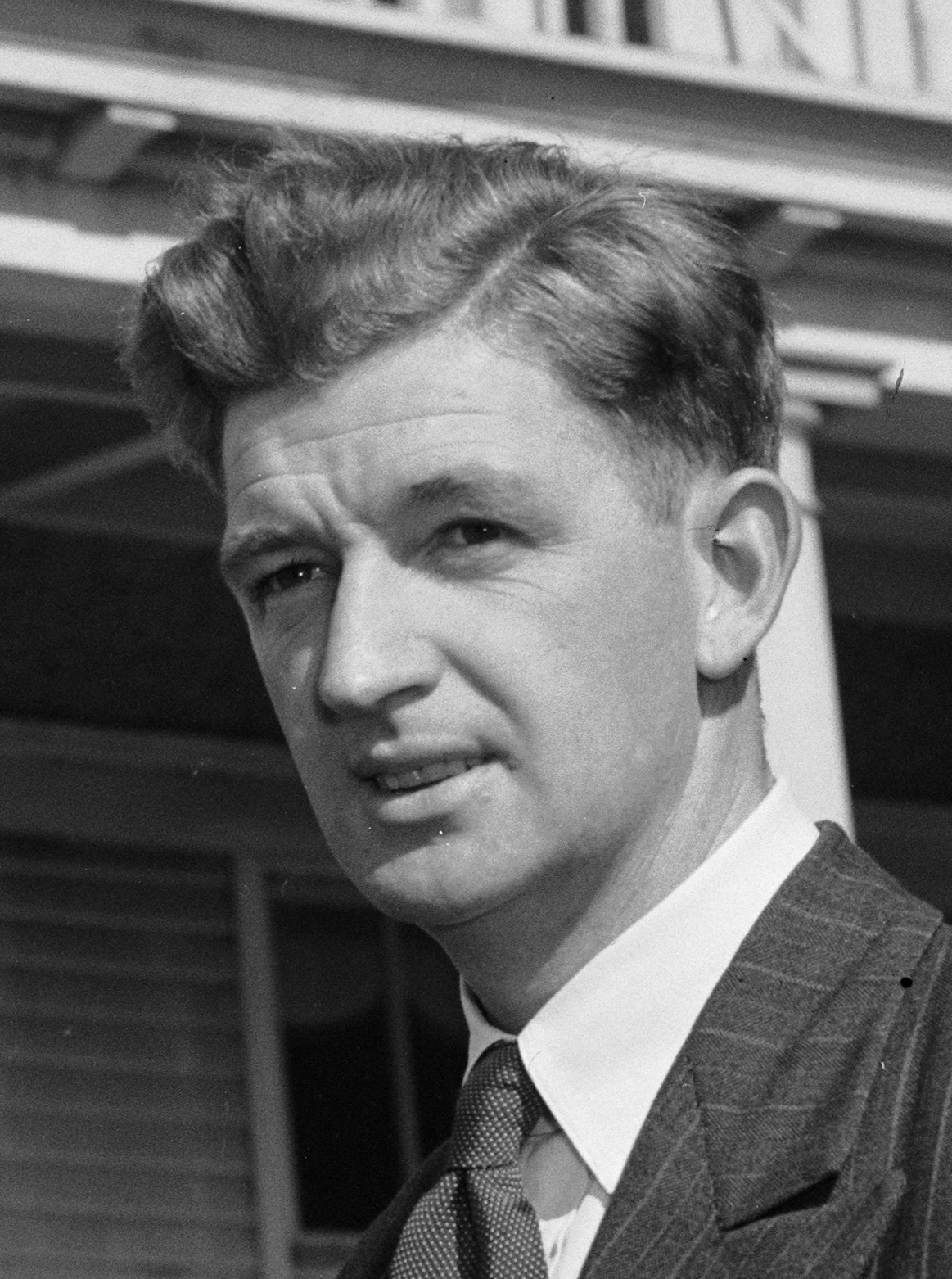
George Lowe

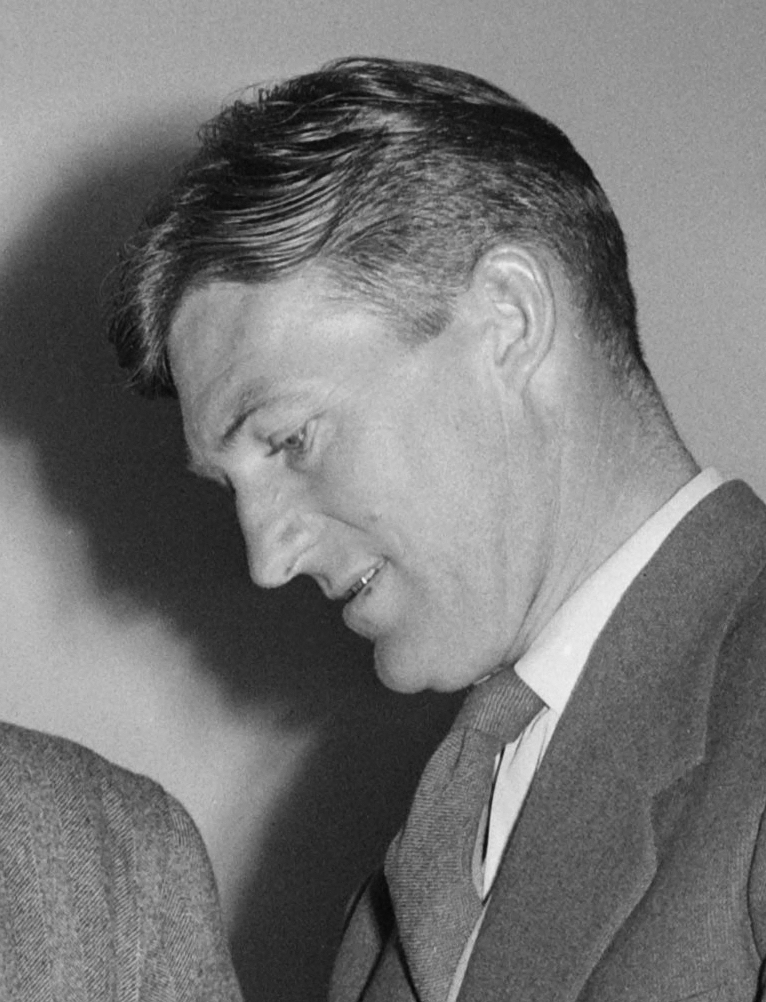
Holmes Miller

=== International Geophysical Year ===
- Dr Trevor Hatherton OBE – of Wellington.
- Vernon Bruce Gerard – of Christchurch.
- John Gerard Humphries – of Christchurch.
- Clayton Ernest Ingham – of Petone.
- Michael William Langevad – of Christchurch.
- William James Peter Macdonald – of Wellington.
- Reginald Herbert Orr – of Waipukurau.
- Herbert Neil Sandford – of Lower Hutt.
