= Frederick Page (disambiguation) =

Sir Frederick Page (1917–2005) was an English aircraft engineer.

Fred Page (1915–1997) was a Canadian ice hockey executive.

Frederick Page or Fred Page may also refer to:

- Fred Page (politician) (1858–1929), Australian politician
- Sir Frederick Handley Page (1885–1962), English aircraft industrialist
- Frederick Page (musician) (1905–1983), New Zealand music professor, pianist and critic
- Frédéric Page (born 1978), Swiss soccer player

== See also ==
- Chase Page (born 1983), American football player
