= 1958 Birthday Honours (New Zealand) =

Award list for New Zealand

The 1958 Queen's Birthday Honours in New Zealand, celebrating the official birthday of Elizabeth II, were appointments made by the Queen on the advice of the New Zealand government to various orders and honours to reward and highlight good works by New Zealanders. They were announced on 12 June 1958.

The recipients of honours are displayed here as they were styled before their new honour.

== Order of Saint Michael and Saint George ==
=== Companion (CMG) ===
- John Cawte Beaglehole – of Wellington. For services in the fields of historical research and literature.
- James Roberts – secretary of the New Zealand Waterside Workers' Federation and the Alliance of Labour.
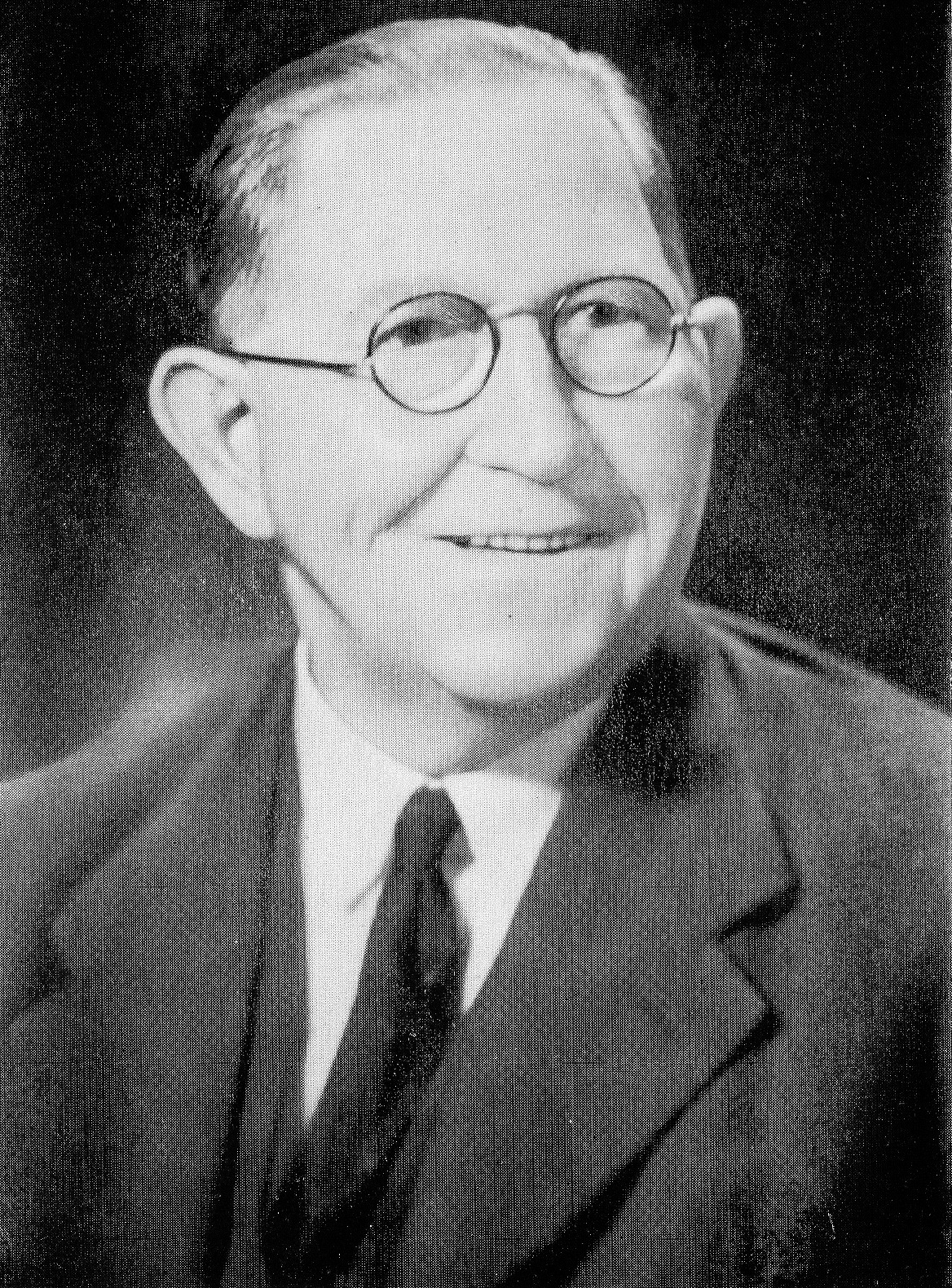
James Roberts

== Order of the British Empire ==
=== Knight Commander (KBE) ===
Civil division

- Charles Ritchie Burns OBE MD FRCP – of Wellington. For services to medicine.
- Frederick Horace Smirk MD FRCP – professor of medicine at the University of Otago.

Military division

- Major-General William George Gentry CB CBE DSO – Generals' List (Retired), New Zealand Army.
- Major-General Keith Lindsay Stewart CB CBE DSO – Generals' List (Retired), New Zealand Army.
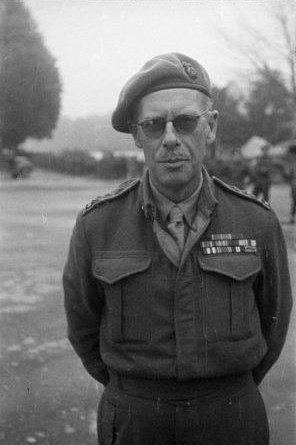
Sir Keith Stewart

=== Commander (CBE) ===
Civil division

- Gilbert Edward Archey OBE – director of the Auckland Institute and Museum.
- James Leggat – headmaster of the Christchurch Boys' High School.
- Campbell Percy McMeekan – superintendent of the Animal Research Station at Ruakura.
- David Miller – an entomologist; director of the Cawthron Institute, Nelson.

Military division

- Air Commodore Charles Campbell Hunter OBE – Royal New Zealand Air Force.
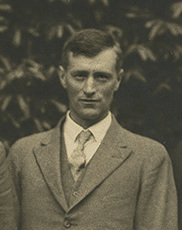
Gilbert Archey

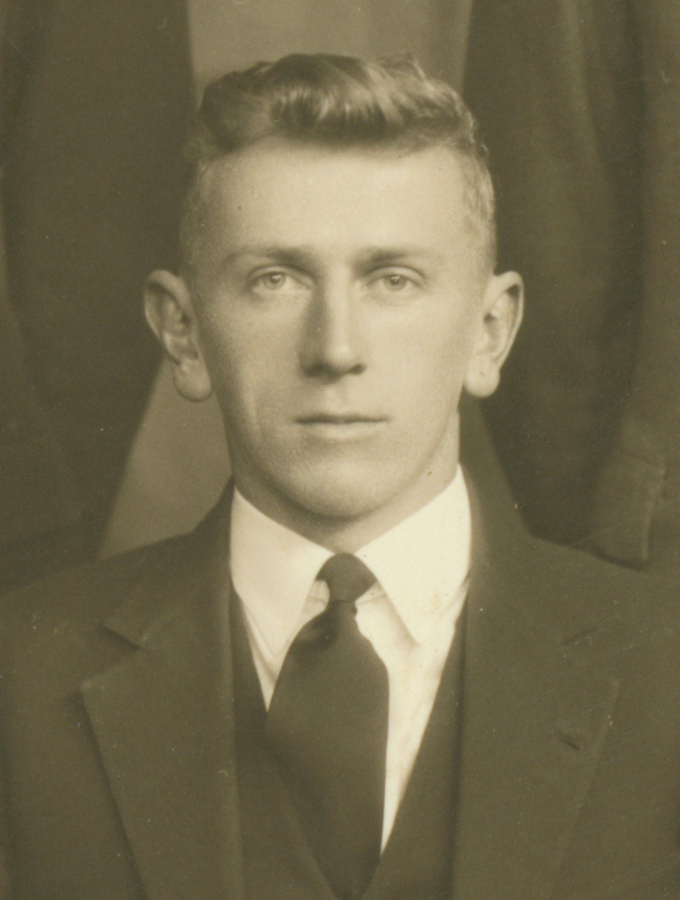
Mac McMeekan

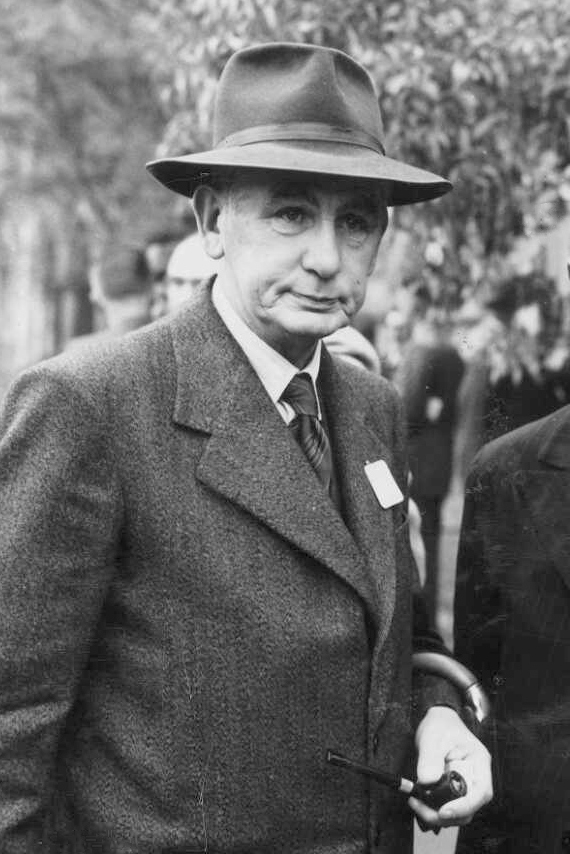
David Miller

=== Officer (OBE) ===
Civil division

- Geoffrey Thomas Alley – director of the National Library Service.
- Estelle Beere – of Wellington; a teacher of dancing for many years.
- The Reverend Colin Douglas Charles Caswell – of Auckland. For services to the community.
- Ernest Charles Empson – president of the New Zealand Registered Music Teachers' Association.
- Trevor Hatherton – Geophysics Division, Department of Scientific and Industrial Research, Wellington.
- Joseph Holmes Miller – deputy leader of the New Zealand Trans-Antarctic Expedition.
- Cecily Mary Wise Pickerill MB ChB – of Wellington. For services in the field of plastic surgery.
- Thomas Athol Rafter – director of the Dominion Physical Laboratory.
- William Stanley Norman Rennie – president of the Electrical Supply Authorities Association and chairman of the Wanganui Power Board.
- Emily Elizabeth Stephens – of Auckland. For services to education.
- John Weeks – an artist, of Auckland.

Military division

- Lieutenant-Colonel Warren John Boyd ED MB ChB – Royal New Zealand Army Medical Corps (Territorial Force).
- Lieutenant-Colonel (temporary) Raymond Francis Smith ED – Royal New Zealand Infantry Corps (Territorial Force).
- Wing Commander Arnold Eric Cockburn – Royal New Zealand Air Force.
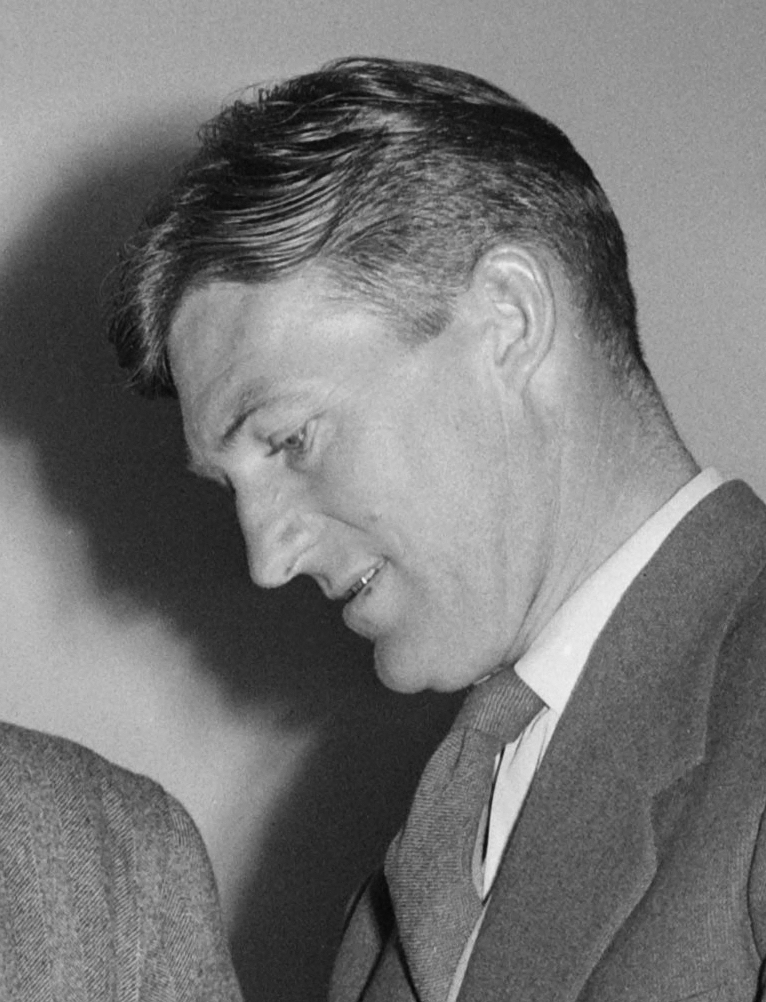
Holmes Miller

=== Member (MBE) ===
Civil division

- Vincent Aspey – of Wellington. For services to music, especially as leader of the National Orchestra.
- Ralph Ewart Barley JP. For services in the field of local government and community work in the Hawke's Bay area.
- Kathleen Buckle. For services to the community in North Auckland.
- William Carran – chief superintendent, New Zealand Police Force.
- Percy William Jones Cockerill – of Timaru. For services to the community.
- Agnes Emily Aurora Faulkner JP – of Tauranga. For social welfare services.
- Kathleen Janet Ford – principal of the Burwood Girls' Training Centre, Christchurch.
- Malama Vaiolae Head – of Niue. For services to education.
- Violet Blanche Rollings JP – mayoress of Onehunga.
- Henry Valentine Horlor JP. For services to the community in local-body affairs in Lower Hutt.
- Agnes Mary Kearns – of Palmerston North. For services to nursing.
- Ngarangi Putiputi Te Kura Kohere – of Dannevirke. For services to nursing.
- Captain Raymond Arthur Parker – Merchant Marine. For services to the community of the North Shore area, Auckland.
- James Malcolm Patrick – chairman of the King Edward Technical College.
- Ellen Alma Rose – lately matron of the public hospital, Waipukurau.
- Oscar Silbery JP. For services to the community in local-body affairs in the Petone area.
- Thomas Stewart Spencer – of Bluff. For services to the Māori people.

Military division

- Lieutenant (SD) Trevor Harry Wickman – Royal New Zealand Navy.
- Warrant Officer Class I George Henry – Royal New Zealand Artillery.
- Major William Aitchison Driscoll McComb ED – Royal New Zealand Army Service Corps (Territorial Force).
- Major Frank Dupree McWha – Royal New Zealand Electrical and Mechanical Engineers.
- Warrant Officer Class I Cecil Max Schwass – New Zealand Regiment.
- Flight Lieutenant Edward Lunn ED – Royal New Zealand Air Force.
- Flight Lieutenant Francis Davitt Mandival Moran – Royal New Zealand Air Force Reserve.
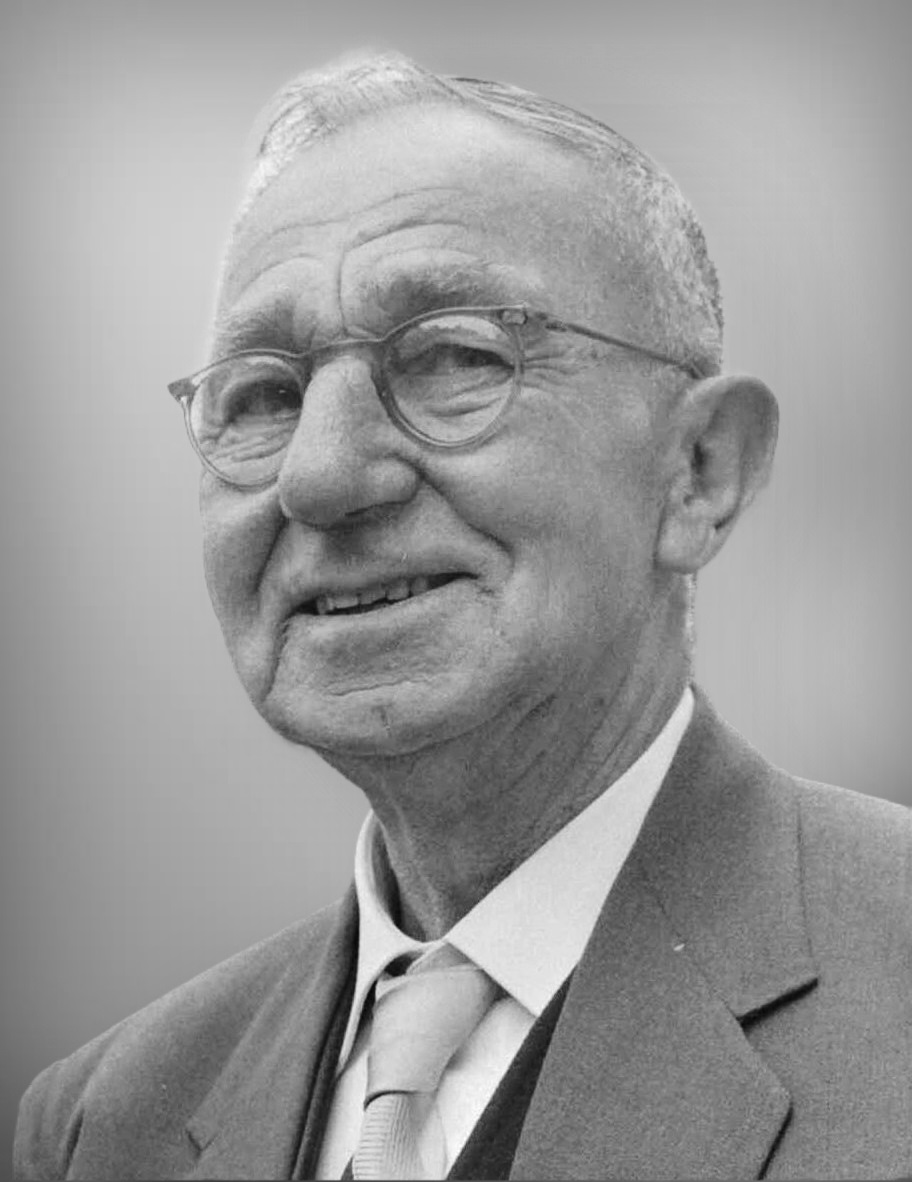
Harry Horlor

== Companion of the Imperial Service Order (ISO) ==
- Leslie Issott Grange – director of New Zealand Geological Survey.
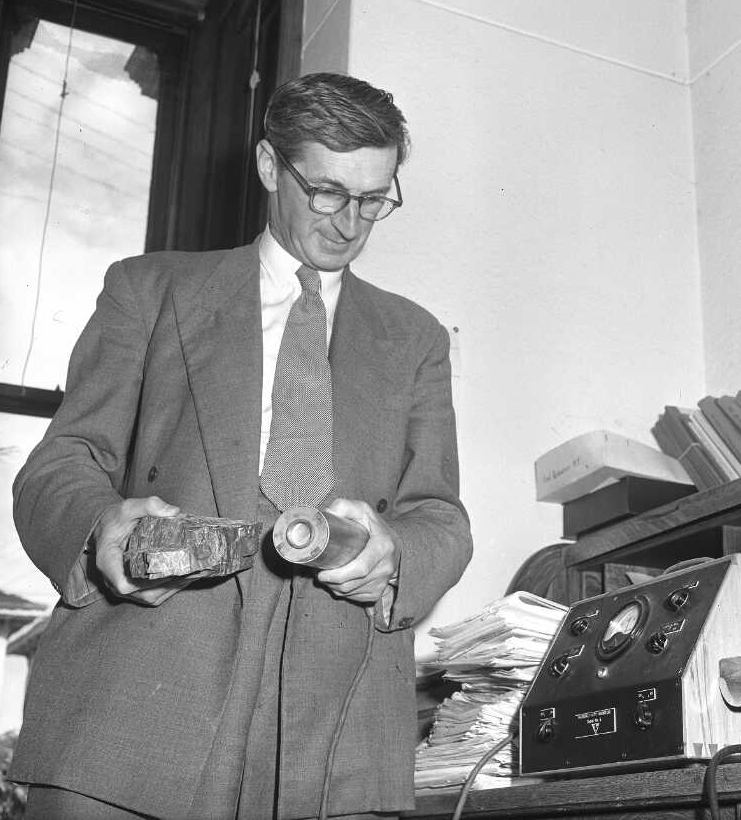
Leslie Grange

== British Empire Medal (BEM) ==
Civil division

- Alonzo George Edgar Beal – senior sergeant, New Zealand Police Force, Bluff.
- John Richard Lucas – night duty officer, Mount Eden Jail, Department of Justice, Auckland.
- William Smith – second-in-charge of store activities, Naval Store Department, HMNZ Dockyard, Auckland.

Military division

- Mechanician 1st Class Roy Alphonsus Berwick – Royal New Zealand Navy.
- Petty Officer Walter John Douglas – Royal New Zealand Navy.
- Chief Electrical Artificer Thomas Gaylor – Royal New Zealand Navy.
- Chief Radio Electrician Peter David Mulgrew – Royal New Zealand Navy.
- Engine Room Artificer Class II Frank Desmond Rastrick – Royal New Zealand Naval Volunteer Reserve.
- Staff-Sergeant Ramon Tinsley – New Zealand Regiment.
- Flight Sergeant Richard James Ruscoe – Royal New Zealand Air Force.
- Sergeant William Rink – Royal New Zealand Air Force.
- Sergeant Laurence Walter Tarr – Royal New Zealand Air Force.

== Air Force Cross (AFC) ==
- Squadron Leader John Richard Claydon – Royal New Zealand Air Force.
- Squadron Leader Keith Bishop Smith – Royal New Zealand Air Force.

== Queen's Police Medal (QPM) ==
- Percy James Nalder MVO – assistant commissioner of the New Zealand Police Force.
