= Athol Rafter =

Teacher, nuclear chemist (1913–1996)

Athol Rafter OBE
- Born: 5 March 1913; Wellington, New Zealand
- Died: 26 September 1996 (aged 83)
- Other names: Wellington, New Zealand
- Scientific career
- Fields: Nuclear science

Thomas Athol Rafter OBE (5 March 1913 – 26 September 1996) was a New Zealand nuclear chemist.

== Life and career ==
Rafter was born in Wellington, New Zealand in on 5 March 1913. He was educated at St Patrick’s College, Wellington, and Victoria University College (BSc in 1935 and MSc in chemistry in 1938). Although carbon dating was invented in the United States by the chemist Willard Libby, New Zealand scientists played a significant part in its early development. Rafter is internationally recognised as one of the pioneers of the technique, and his publications form part of the core of radiocarbon literature.

Nuclear scientist Rodger Sparks recognises Athol Rafter’s contribution to radiocarbon dating in Radiocarbon dating – New Zealand beginnings, New Zealand Science Review, 61, 2 (2004)

Athol Rafter was one of New Zealand’s pioneering nuclear scientists, that started his career as part of Ernest Marsden’s post-war team of nuclear scientists and leading the DSIR’s Institute of Nuclear Sciences through the 1960s and 1970s.

Rafter was educated in Wellington, gaining a Master of Science in chemistry from Victoria University College in 1938. Rafter worked as a schoolteacher until a job as a research scientist became available at the Dominion Laboratory in 1940. Rafter initially concentrated on analysis of coal ash, but gained much acclaim when he worked with rock analyst Fred Seelye on a new method of analysing uranium-bearing minerals found in beach sands on the West Coast of New Zealand.

In 1948, following the establishment of a nuclear sciences team at the DSIR, Rafter was sent to the United States to train in radiochemistry and to visit nuclear establishments in the United States, Canada and England. On Rafter's return, he began to work with the new technique of radiocarbon dating, which dates organic material by comparing the ratio of radiocarbon atoms (carbon-14) to regular carbon atoms (carbon-12) with established radiocarbon: carbon ratios from the past. Rafter first used the method to date moa bones and ash showers from volcanos on the North Island of New Zealand. After difficulties with the process published by Willard Libby, radiocarbon dating’s American pioneer, Rafter worked with DSIR physicist Gordon Fergusson and their team to perfect a new and reliable method of radiocarbon dating using carbon dioxide gas rather than solid carbon.

In the 1958 Queen's Birthday Honours, Rafter was appointed an Officer of the Order of the British Empire, in recognition of his service as director of the Dominion Physical Laboratory.

In 1959, Rafter was appointed the inaugural director of the DSIR’s Institute of Nuclear Sciences, in Gracefield, New Zealand. In his new position, Rafter encouraged research into natural variations in radiocarbon levels, in the process discovering a link between atmospheric nuclear weapons tests and rising levels of radiocarbon in the atmosphere, a phenomenon he and Fergusson called the ‘Atom Bomb Effect’ when they published their results in 1957. Rafter also encouraged the use of naturally occurring stable (non-radioactive) isotopes for geological research, developing techniques for use in geothermal and environmental studies.

After retiring from the DSIR, Rafter spent two years as director of the United Nations Environment Programme Monitoring and Assessment Research Centre in London. In 1993, the Institute of Geological and Nuclear Sciences marked Rafter’s 80th birthday by naming their radiocarbon dating facility the Rafter Radiocarbon Laboratory.
