= Hatherton =

Hatherton may refer to:

- Hatherton, Cheshire, England
- Hatherton, Staffordshire, England
  - The derelict Hatherton Canal
  - Baron Hatherton
- Hatherton Glacier, in East Antarctica, named for Trevor Hatherton
