= Claridge Terrace =

Claridge Terrace (77°41′46″S 162°21′17″E) is a relatively horizontal area, 0.75 mile square with a median elevation of 1050 meters, between Mount J. J. Thomson and the northern wall of Taylor Valley, Victoria Land. Named by the New Zealand Geographic Board in 1998 after Graeme Claridge, New Zealand Soil Bureau, whose Antarctic research from 1959 spanned over 35 years.
