= Morice Fieldes =

- Scientific career
- Institutions: Soil Bureau

Morice Fieldes (1914 – 1973) was a New Zealand soil chemist and science administrator. He worked initially at Chemistry Division, DSIR, before moving to Soil Bureau, where he rose to be director. The New Zealand Society of Soil Science has an award in his memory.

== Morice Fieldes memorial award ==
- 2005 Haydon Jones (University of Waikato) and Fabio Moreno (Massey University)
- 2012 Andre Eger (Lincoln University)
- 2014 Paul Mudge
