= Eddie Robertson (geophysicist) =

New Zealand geophysicist (1919–2022)

Edwin Ian Robertson CBE (21 January 1919 – 31 October 2022) was a New Zealand geophysicist and administrator.

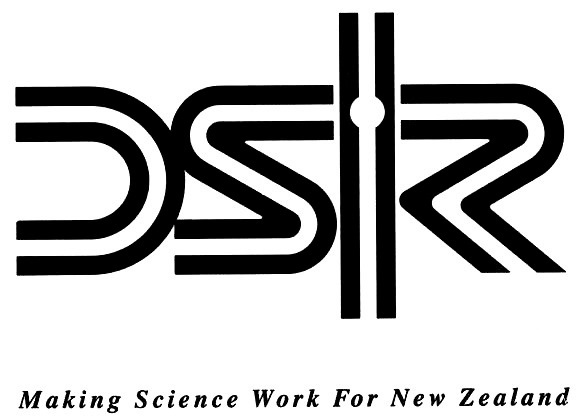
Logo of the NZ Division of Scientific Research of which Robertson was Director General 1971–1980.

== Biography ==
Robertson was born in Petone, near Wellington, and is of Scottish parentage. His high-achieving academic record started early as he was made dux of Petone Central Primary School in 1930. After attending Hutt Valley High School (also dux) he attended Victoria University of Wellington supported by a National Scholarship. He graduated in 1939 with an MSc with first class honours.

The Second World War interrupted his academic career. His RSNZ obituary relates that he was offered a job by Sir Ernest Marsden over the phone at 4:30pm and traveled overnight by train to Auckland to start work the next morning. His wartime work focused on submarine detection. At the end of the war he returned to his studies now at London University and was awarded his PhD in geophysics in 1948 on the topic of the magnetic properties of rocks. After his studies he was recruited back the DSIR as a geophysical scientist.

He conducted research including a network of gravity observations resolved from over 400 gravity measurement stations around New Zealand. This work was extended to include surveying of some Pacific Islands including the Cook Islands which evolved into an analysis of the bathymetric slope around volcanic atolls.

He was the first Director of the Geophysics Division of the DSIR. His appointment to this position in 1951 meant that he was instrumental in New Zealand's contribution to the 1957-58 International Geophysical Year. Activity that resulted from this included the New Zealand IGY Antarctic Expedition led by Trevor Hatherton. New Zealand's Scott Base was opened under his leadership.

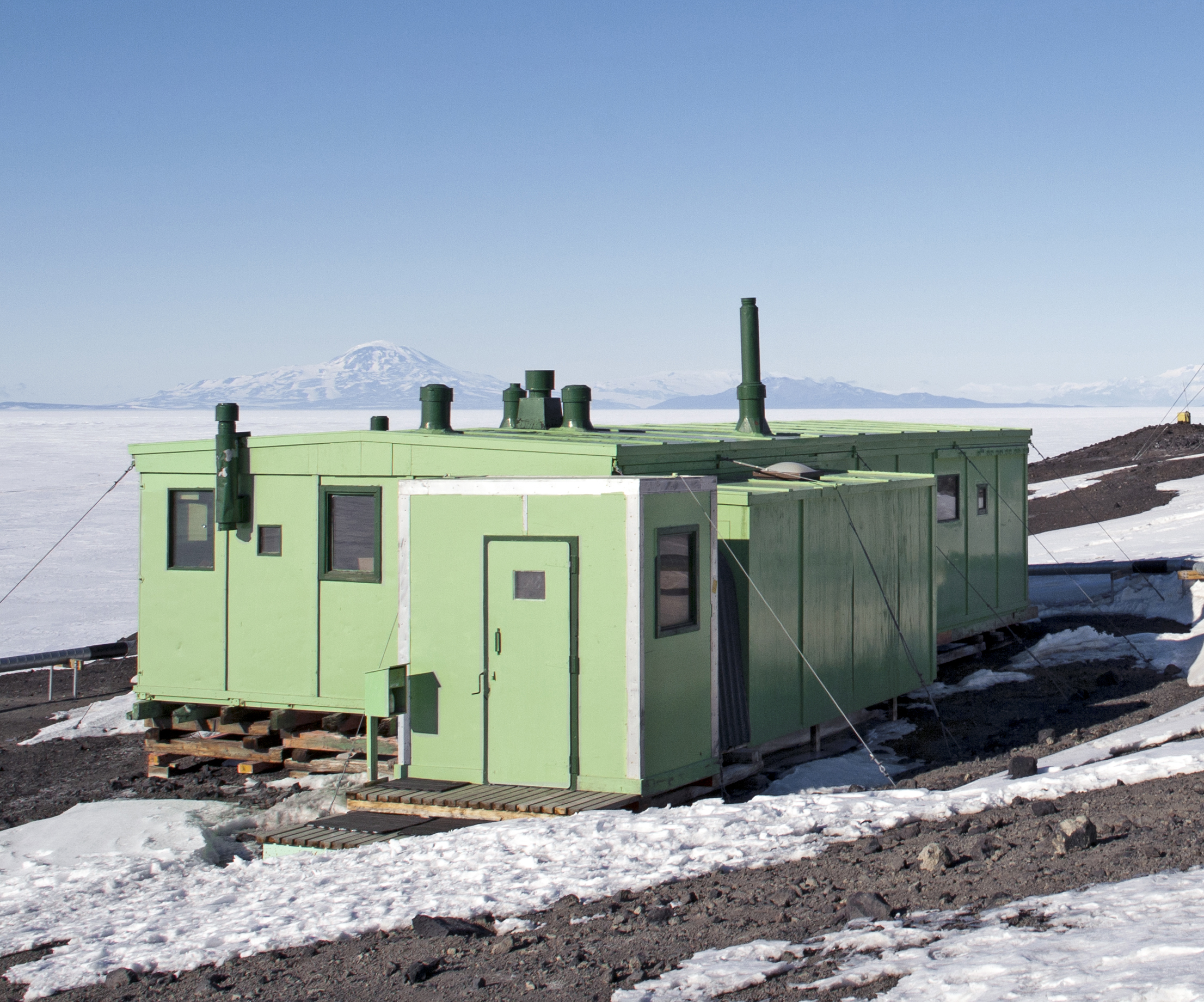
First building at Scott Base, Antarctica

After his time leading the Geophysics Division he went on to hold the role of Director General of the DSIR from 1971 until his retirement in 1980. He believed that a research institute needed a scientist as director – “to lead and not push”. He was also a critic of early-1990s reforms of the New Zealand government-funded science system that sought to drive the system through competition rather than collaboration.

He remained active after retirement, remarkably publishing a paper at the age of 99. He also worked with the NZ Futures Trust which published reports on future opportunities and challenges for New Zealand.

== Personal life ==
Robertson married Star Chalk and had two daughters. Chalk and Robertson met studying mathematics and she was described as having "a most effective backhand" in a review of the table tennis club at Victoria University. She was also an artist and director of plays.

== Honours ==
Mount Robertson in the Victoria Land Range is named in his honour. In addition, he was awarded the OBE (1963), the Queen Elizabeth II Silver Jubilee Medal (1977), CBE (1981) all for services to science. He was also a Fellow of the Royal Society of New Zealand (now known as Royal Society Te Apārangi).
