= Aspey =

Aspey is an English surname. Notable people by that name include:

- James Aspey (born 1986), Australian animal rights activist and lecturer
- Mal Aspey (born 1947), English former professional rugby league footballer
- Vincent Aspey (1909–1987), New Zealand musician
