= Bruce Miller (soil scientist) =

New Zealand soil scientist and science administrator (1922–2022)

Bruce Miller OBE
- Born: Ronald Bruce Miller; 19 October 1922; Kaikōura, New Zealand
- Died: 23 January 2022 (aged 99); Waikanae, New Zealand
- Spouse: Nina Rae McLaughlin (m. 1955)
- Children: 4
- Scientific career
- Fields: Soil chemistry
- Institutions: Soil Bureau

Ronald Bruce Miller OBE (19 October 1922 – 23 January 2022) was a New Zealand soil chemist and scientific administrator. He rose to become director of the Soil Bureau in 1973, and later served as chief director of the Department of Scientific and Industrial Research.

== Early life and family ==
Born in Kaikōura on 19 October 1922, Miller was the son of Ronald Miller, a Presbyterian minister, and Jessie Miller (née McGregor). He was educated at Manaia District High School in South Taranaki and Palmerston North Boys' High School, and went on to study at the University of Otago, graduating Master of Science with third-class honours in 1945, and Victoria University College, earning a Bachelor of Arts degree in 1949. He undertook postgraduate study at the Royal Agricultural College in Sweden.

On 26 February 1955, Miller married Nina Rae McLaughlin, and the couple went on to have four children.

== Career ==
Miller was a soil scientist at the Soil Bureau from 1945, rising to become a section leader in 1971, and director in 1973. He later served as chief director of the Department of Scientific and Industrial Research, and was appointed an Officer of the Order of the British Empire in the 1984 New Year Honours. In 1990, he was awarded the New Zealand 1990 Commemoration Medal.

From 1968 to 1969, Miller was an André Meyer Fellow at the Food and Agriculture Organization in Rome. He served on the council of the New Zealand Society of Soil Science from 1953 to 1974, and was president of the organisation from 1966 to 1968. He was a council member of the International Society of Soil Science in 1974, and was a Fellow of the New Zealand Institute of Chemistry. He was a Companion of the Royal Society of New Zealand (CRSNZ) Royal Society Te Apārangi.

Miller was a member of the Wairarapa Catchment Board from 1973 to 1982, and served on the Water Resources Council between 1978 and 1982. He was an elder of the Ngaio Union Church from 1957, and a board member of Presbyterian Support Services from 1988 to 1991. He was also a member of the advisory committee of the Stout Trust, a philanthropic charitable trust, from 1983.

Miller died in Waikanae on 23 January 2022, at the age of 99. His wife, Rae Miller, died a few months later, on 16 June 2022.
