= Joseph Dixon (soil scientist) =

New Zealand chemist (1906–1966)

Joseph Keith Dixon
- Born: 1906; New Zealand
- Died: 1966 (aged 59–60)
- Other names: Joseph K. Dixon

Joseph Keith Dixon (1906–1966) was a New Zealand soil chemist and scientific administrator. He completed a master's thesis at Canterbury University College in 1927. He rose to be director of Soil Bureau 1962–1966 and President of the Royal Society of New Zealand (1960–1962).
