= Witi Ihimaera Smiler =

New Zealand writer (born 1944)

Witi Ihimaera Smiler DCNZM QSM
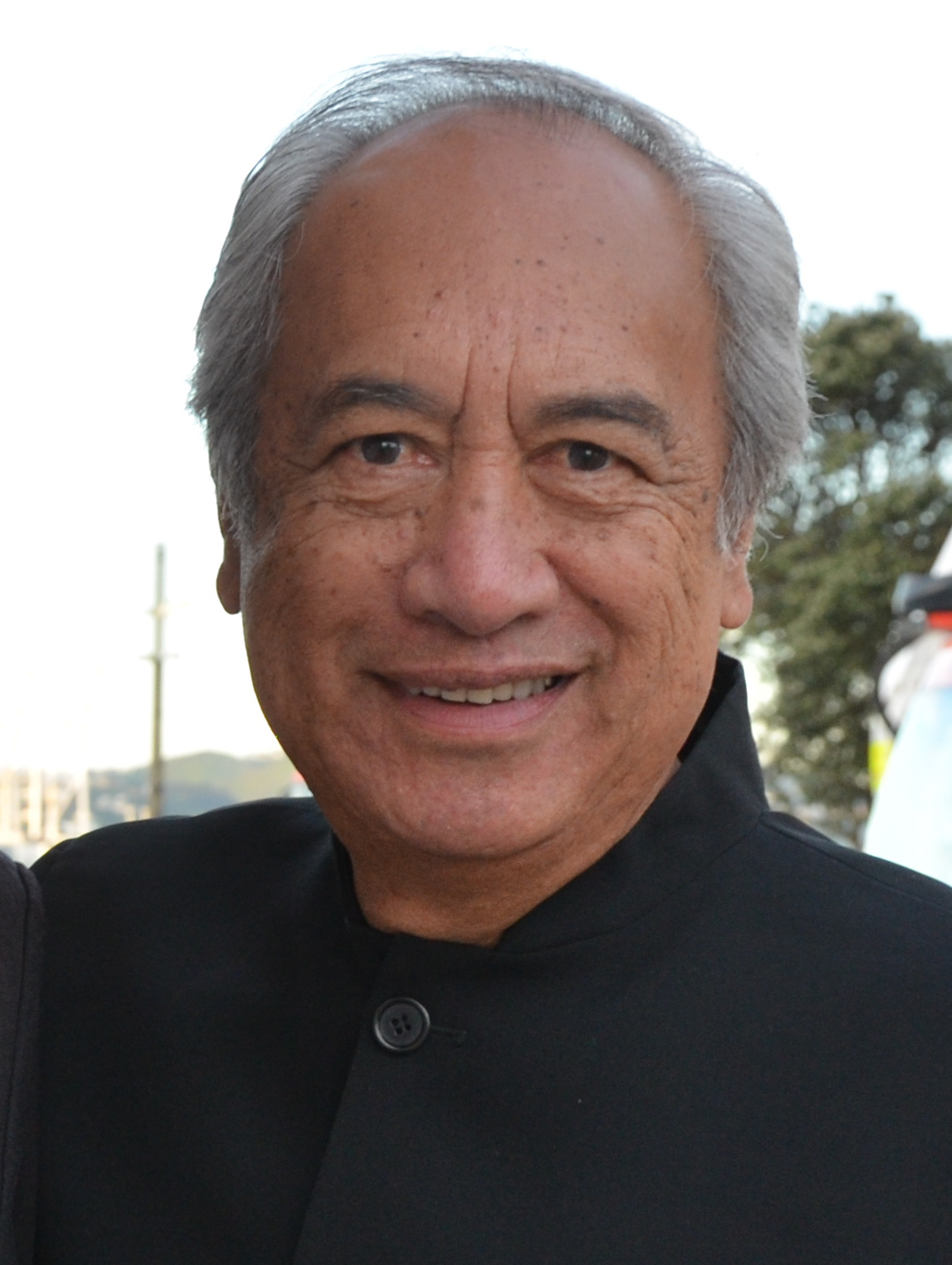
- Ihimaera in November 2015
- Born: Witi Tame Ihimaera Smiler; 7 February 1944 (age 82); Waituhi, New Zealand
- Education: Victoria University of Wellington (BA)
- Occupations: Writer; academic
- Children: 2
- Writing career
- Language: English; Māori

Witi Tame Ihimaera Smiler DCNZM QSM (/ˈwɪti ɪhiˈmaɪrə/; born 7 February 1944) is a New Zealand author. Raised in the small town of Waituhi, he decided to become a writer as a teenager after being convinced that Māori people were ignored or mischaracterised in literature. He was the first Māori writer to publish a collection of short stories, with Pounamu, Pounamu (1972), and the first to publish a novel, with Tangi (1973). After his early works, he took a ten-year break from writing, during which he focused on editing an anthology of Māori writing in English.

From the late 1980s onwards, Ihimaera wrote prolifically. In his novels, plays, short stories and opera librettos, he examines contemporary Māori culture, legends and history, and the impacts of colonisation in New Zealand. He has said that "Māori culture is the taonga, the treasure vault from which I source my inspiration". His 1987 novel The Whale Rider is his best-known work, read widely by children and adults both in New Zealand and overseas. It was adapted into the critically acclaimed 2002 film Whale Rider directed by Niki Caro. His semi-autobiographical novel Nights in the Gardens of Spain (1996) was about a married man coming to terms with his homosexuality. In later works he has dealt with historical events such as the campaign of non-violent resistance at Parihaka in the late nineteenth century.

Ihimaera is an influential figure in New Zealand literature, and over his long career has won numerous awards and fellowships, including multiple awards for both fiction and non-fiction at the New Zealand Book Awards spanning the period 1973 to 2016, the Robert Burns Fellowship (1975), the Katherine Mansfield Menton Fellowship (1993), and a Prime Minister's Award for Literary Achievement (2017). Until 2010 he was the Professor of English and Distinguished Creative Fellow in Māori Literature at the University of Auckland. He has since published two volumes of his memoirs: Māori Boy: A Memoir of Childhood (2014) and Native Son: The Writer's Memoir (2019).

== Early life and education ==
Ihimaera was born in Gisborne, a city in the east of New Zealand's North Island and is of Māori descent. His iwi (tribe) is Te Aitanga-a-Māhaki. He has affiliations to Ngāi Tūhoe, Te Whānau-ā-Apanui, Ngāti Kahungunu, Ngāi Tāmanuhiri, Rongowhakaata, Ngāti Porou, and Whakatōhea. He also has Scottish ancestry through both parents. His family marae is Te Rongopai Marae in Waituhi, and he grew up in Waituhi—many of his stories are set in a fictional recreation of the town. He began writing at a young age, and in later life recounted writing stories on the wall of his childhood bedroom.

He attended Te Karaka District High School for three years and the Church College of New Zealand in Temple View, Hamilton, for one year, after which he completed his final year of schooling at Gisborne Boys' High School. He has said that he became interested in becoming a writer when he was fifteen and realised that Māori did not feature in the books he read. His schoolteacher then instructed his class to read the short story "The Whare" by Pākehā writer Douglas Stewart, about a young man who encounters a Māori settlement. He found the story "so poisonous" that he threw the book out of the window and was caned for doing so. Writing about the incident in his 2014 memoir Māori Boy, he said:

My ambition to be a writer was voiced that day. I said to myself that I was going to write a book about Māori people, not just because it had to be done but because I needed to unpoison the stories already written about Māori; and it would be taught in every school in New Zealand, whether they wanted it or not.

In 1959 he applied to sit the School Certificate exams, which required a birth certificate. When this arrived he saw the name printed was "Witi Tame Ihimaera (Smiler)", which he recalls was the first time he learned of his Māori surname Ihimaera; "Smiler" according to family tradition was a surname that the Mormon missionaries who converted his grandfather from the Ringatū faith called him because they could not easily pronounce "Ihimaera". His great grandfather was named Ihimaera Te Hānene, Ihimaera being a transliteration of Ishmael. Ihimaera sat the exam as Witi Ihimaera, which, as he describes in his autobiography Te Kaikaukau / The Swimmer, became his pen name and "political self", while "Witi Smiler" remained his "personal self". Around the 2026 publication of Te Kaikaukau, which describes his journey learning te reo Māori, he began to go by Witi Ihimaera Smiler.

After high school, Ihimaera attended the University of Auckland for three years, from 1963 to 1966, but did not complete his degree, and returned to Gisborne where he became a cadet journalist for the Gisborne Herald. He subsequently became a postman, moved to Wellington and started studying part-time at Victoria University of Wellington, where he completed his Bachelor of Arts in 1971. He met librarian and student Jane Cleghorn at university, and they married in 1970.

== Career ==
=== Early career: 1960s and 1970s ===
Ihimaera began writing seriously in 1969, around the age of 25, and had his first short story "The Liar" accepted for publication by the New Zealand Listener magazine in May 1970. Six of his stories were read by George Henare on Radio New Zealand in 1969. Ihimaera's first book, Pounamu Pounamu (1972), was a collection of short stories, which was awarded third prize at the Goodman Fielder Wattie Book Awards in 1973. Ihimaera has said it was rejected by three publishers before being accepted by the fourth. His first two novels were published in quick succession: Tangi (1973), which won first prize at the Goodman Fielder Wattie Book Awards in 1974, and Whanau (1974), which told the story of a day in the life of a Māori village. He was the first Māori writer to publish a collection of short stories and the first to publish a novel.

Norman Kirk, then the prime minister of New Zealand, read Pounamu Pounamu and arranged for Ihimaera to be employed as a writer at the New Zealand Ministry of Foreign Affairs in 1973. During his career he wrote a non-fiction booklet called Māori (1975), later adapted into a short film of the same name in 1981, although he felt the final film was a propaganda exercise that bore little resemblance to his written work. He subsequently worked as a diplomat with posts in Canberra, New York City, and Washington, D.C. In 1975 he was the recipient of the Robert Burns Fellowship at the University of Otago, and in 1982 he received a Victoria University of Wellington writing fellowship.

Beginning in 1975, Ihimaera stopped his own creative writing for a ten-year period, due to his belief that it was "tragically out of date" and a wish not to have it seen as the "definitive portrayal of the world of the Maori". He instead began working on the anthology Into the World of Light (1982), together with co-editor Don Long. The anthology collected the work of 39 Māori writers. In Ihimaera and Long's introduction, they said that Māori oral tradition formed the context for Māori literature, and observed that the apparent lack of Māori writing in the mid-20th century was due to publishers' reluctance to publish books by Māori writers because of a belief that Māori "don't read books". The Oxford Companion to New Zealand Literature described the collected works as being "of a uniformly high standard", and Graham Wiremu writing in the New Zealand Listener called the anthology "prodigious and powerful".

=== Return to writing: 1980s and 1990s ===
When Ihimaera began writing again, he wrote The Matriarch (1986) which examined the impacts of European colonisation on Māori, and which again received first prize at the Goodman Fielder Wattie Book Awards. Not long after publication, it came to light that Ihimaera had used passages from the entry on Māori land in An Encyclopaedia of New Zealand (1966), written by Keith Sorrenson, without acknowledgement. Ihimaera apologised to Sorrenson at the time. Mark Williams later noted that the consequences for Ihimaera were minor, and he became a professor in the year of the book's publication. He also wrote a libretto for an opera by Ross Harris, based on his second novel Whanau, and Dear Miss Mansfield (1989), a rewriting of Katherine Mansfield's short stories from a Māori perspective, in response to celebrations of 100 years since her birth. The collection was well-received overseas but criticised by New Zealand reviewers for a perceived lack of respect for Mansfield.

In a three-week period Ihimaera wrote his best-known work The Whale Rider (1987), the story of a young girl becoming a leader of her people. It has been reprinted many times, read by both adults and children and was adapted into the critically acclaimed film of the same name in 2002. It won the Nielsen BookData New Zealand Booksellers' Choice Award in 2003. It was published and read internationally; Kirkus Reviews described it as a "luminous joining of myth and contemporary culture".

In 1989, he left his job as a diplomat at the Ministry of Foreign Affairs, and the following year he became a lecturer in the English department at the University of Auckland. He later became Professor of English and Distinguished Creative Fellow in Māori Literature, until 2010. He was awarded a Scholarship in Letters in 1991. In 1993 he received the Katherine Mansfield Memorial Fellowship which allowed him to work in Menton, France, for a period, where he wrote his next two novels: Bulibasha: King of the Gypsies (1994) and Nights in the Gardens of Spain (1996). Bulibasha: King of the Gypsies was awarded the prize for Fiction at the Montana New Zealand Book Awards in 1995. It was described in The Dominion Post as "a rollicking good yarn about Maori rural life in the 1950s", and Ihimaera himself has said he was intending to write a Māori Western. The novel was adapted into the 2016 film Mahana by Lee Tamahori (released as The Patriarch outside of New Zealand).

In 1996, he published Nights in the Gardens of Spain, a semi-autobiographical novel about a man coming out. Like Ihimaera, the main character was married with two daughters, but unlike Ihimaera the main character was Pākehā (European). Ihimaera had accepted his sexuality in 1984 and began the work, but out of sensitivity to his daughters, did not finish or publish it then. The novel was described by scholar Roger Robinson as featuring "conflict, growth and reconciliation, with subplots heroic, political and tragic". Robinson said it was "no small achievement to take this material off the grubby walls of public toilets, free it from sleaze, write it with vivid passion and through it affirm and celebrate a way of life of which most of us know almost nothing". In a review for The Dominion Post, Gavin McLean described it as Ihimaera's best book to date, and noted that much of the book's impact came from the intensity of the main character's relationship with his parents and his "desperate need to do better by his children"; "Unlike characters in many similar novels, coming out does not mean discarding all one's past." In 2010, it was adapted into the film Kawa by director Katie Wolfe. The central character was changed from Pākehā to Māori businessman Kawa, played by Calvin Tuteao. In an article in The Sunday Star Times, Ihimaera was quoted as saying the change "was quite a shock to me because I had always tried to hide, to say 'this is a book that could be about "everyman", this is not a specific story'. So [the film] is now actually nearer to the truth than I would like to admit." After the publication of the novel, Ihimaera and his wife remained married, but no longer lived together.

A decade after his anthology Into the World of Light (1982), Ihimaera edited the five-volume bilingual anthology of Māori writing, Te Ao Marama ("the world of light"), published between 1992 and 1996. It represented the most comprehensive collection of writing by Māori writers that had been published at that time. In 1997 he published The Dream Swimmer, a sequel to his 1986 novel The Matriarch. That same year, Mataora, The Living Face: Contemporary Māori Artists, which he co-edited with Sandy Adsett and Cliff Whiting, received the Montana Award for Illustrative Arts at the Montana New Zealand Book Awards. His poem "O numi tutelar" was recited at the dawn opening of the British Museum's long-awaited 'Maori' Exhibition in 1998.

=== Later career: 2000 onwards ===
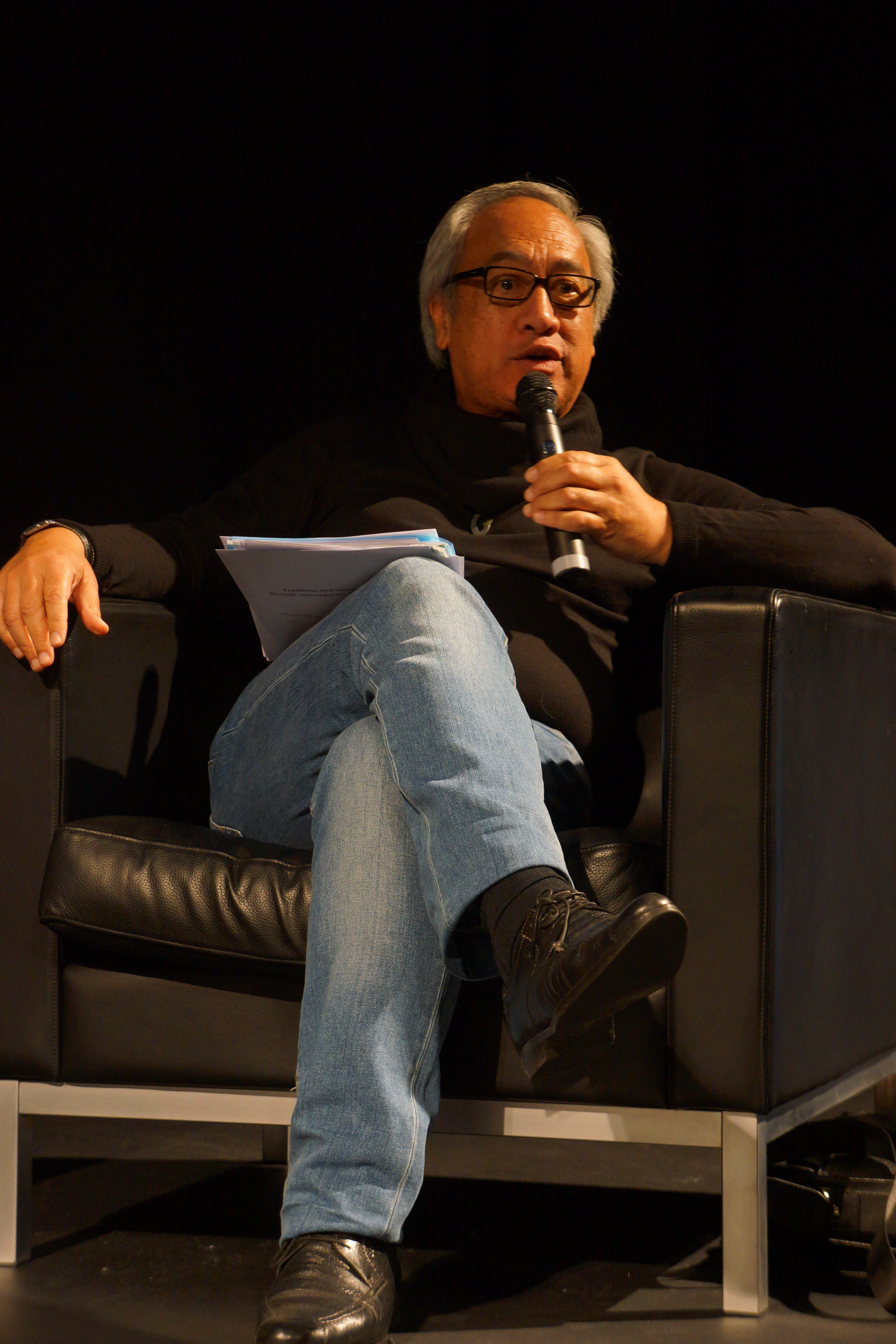
Ihimaera in Frankfurt in October 2012.

In the early 2000s Ihimaera published Woman Far Walking (2000), a play from the perspective of an elder Māori woman who has witnessed key historic events and who Ihimaera describes as the personification of the Treaty of Waitangi. He also published The Uncle's Story (2000), a love story about two generations of gay Māori men, children's picture book The Little Kowhai Tree (2002) (illustrated by Henry Campbell), and the novel Sky Dancer (2003), featuring Māori myths with contemporary characters. Sky Dancer was shortlisted for Best Book in the South Pacific & South East Asian Region of the 2004 Commonwealth Writers' Prize. In 2004, he published Whanau II, which featured the characters of his second novel Whanau (1974), and which was subsequently published in London under the title Band of Angels (2005). His novella "The Halcyon Summer" was published in Nine New Zealand Novellas (2005), edited by Peter Simpson. The Rope of Man was published in 2005, which featured both a revised version of his first novel Tangi (1973) and a new sequel The Return. His short story collection Ask at the Posts of the House (2007) was longlisted for the Frank O'Connor International Short Story Award, and one of the novellas included in that collection was adapted into the 2013 film White Lies. In 2003, and again in 2009, Penguin New Zealand published His Best Stories, a collection of twenty-four stories selected by Ihimaera.

In 2009, Ihimaera published The Trowenna Sea, a novel about the early history of Tasmania. At the time, he planned to write a trilogy. Shortly after publication, book reviewer Jolisa Gracewood detected short passages from other writers, especially from historical sources, used without acknowledgement. Ihimaera apologised for not acknowledging the passages, said the omission was inadvertent and negligent, and pointed to many pages of other sources that he had acknowledged. The University of Auckland investigated the incident and ruled that Ihimaera's actions did not constitute misconduct in research, as the actions did not appear to be deliberate and Ihimaera had apologised. Gracewood subsequently found additional passages that had been copied without explanation, and the book's publisher Penguin Books removed the book from public sale. Ihimaera purchased the remaining stock himself. A revised edition, with fuller acknowledgements, originally planned for 2010, was subsequently cancelled, with no reasons given for the decision. Some literary commentators, such as Vincent O'Sullivan, C.K. Stead and Mark Williams, criticised the university's response to the incident. Keith Sorrenson said that the events suggested Ihimaera had "learnt nothing" from his earlier plagiarism of Sorrenson's work in The Matriarch (1986).

His twelfth novel, The Parihaka Woman (2011), featured elements of the opera Fidelio and the history of Parihaka and the campaign of non-violent resistance. Michael O'Leary, writing in the online edition of Landfall, called it an "intriguing and significant, if somewhat flawed, work"; he praised the novel's efforts to tackle the horrific events at Parihaka in the late nineteenth century, and the demonstration of the rich cultural life of Māori in that period, but also noted some issues in the detail of Ihimaera's use of Māori lore and in historical accuracies. Reviewers for the Sunday Star-Times, Otago Daily Times and The New Zealand Herald were more negative, and all noted Ihimaera's use of an amateur historian as narrator; they noted that this device allowed him to add numerous citations and references, and avoid any further accusations of plagiarism, but detracted from the quality of the writing. It was followed by the short-story collection The Thrill of Falling (2012), in which Ihimaera explored a range of genres including contemporary comedy and science fiction.

Māori Boy: A Memoir of Childhood (2014) was the first instalment of Ihimaera's memoirs and recorded experiences from his childhood up till his teenage years. It received the award for General Non-Fiction at the 2016 Ockham New Zealand Book Awards. The second instalment, Native Son: A Writer's Memoir was published in 2019, and covers his early adult years in the 1960s and 1970s and how he became a published writer. After finishing Native Son, he decided to take a four-year break from writing, but ended up instead writing Navigating the Stars: Māori Creation Myths (2020), a modern re-telling of traditional Māori legends.

In 2019, the play Witi's Wāhine premiered at Te Tairāwhiti Arts Festival. Written by playwright Nancy Brunning, who died in the same year, the play is a tribute to female characters in Ihimaera's works. Ihimaera wrote the script for a stage show adaptation of Navigating the Stars, produced by theatre company Taki Rua, which was performed at the Soundshell in the Wellington Botanic Garden in early 2021. In 2022, Pounamu Pounamu was re-issued by Penguin Random House with a new introduction by Ihimaera. In 2023, he edited an anthology of non-fiction Māori writing, Ngā Kupu Wero.

=== Legacy ===
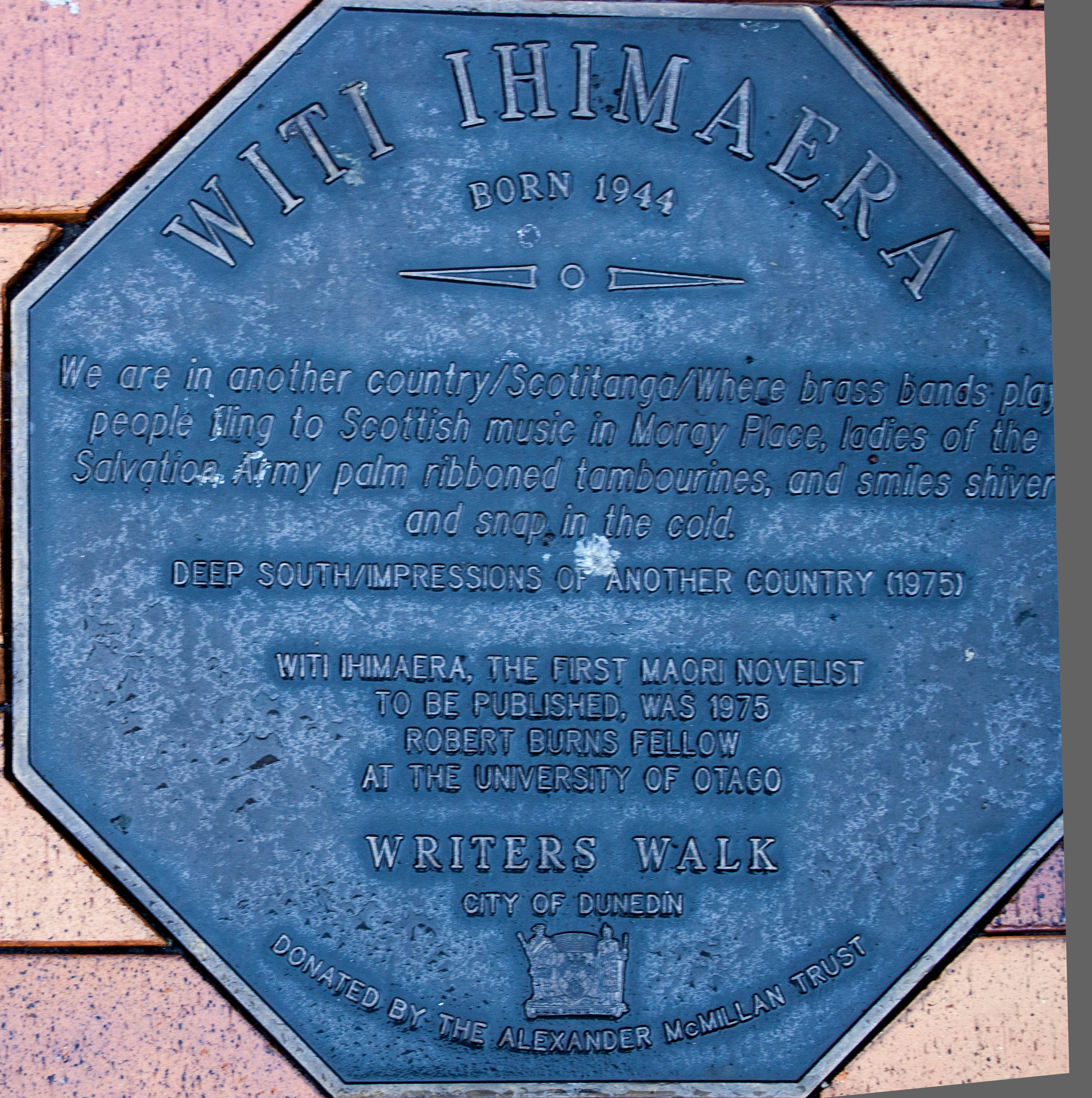
Plaque dedicated to Witi Ihimaera in Dunedin, on the Writers' Walk on the Octagon

Ihimaera has been recognised as "one of the world's leading indigenous writers". Literary scholar and Professor Emeritus at the University of Otago Alistair Fox in The Ship of Dreams: Masculinity in Contemporary New Zealand Fiction (2008) devotes four of the eleven chapters in the book to the writings of Ihimaera, indicating his importance within the context of New Zealand literature. Fox describes his epic novel The Matriarch as "one of the major and most telling 'monuments' of New Zealand's cultural history in the late twentieth century as far as the situation of Māori in this postcolonial society is concerned", noting that Ihimaera "has remained at the forefront of Māori arts and letters to an unprecedented degree, with an impressive output across a range of genres".

As part of the Auckland Arts Festival 2011, musician Charlotte Yates directed and produced the stage project "Ihimaera", featuring Ihimaera's lyrics about his life and works, and with performances by New Zealand musicians including Victoria Girling-Butcher, Paul Ubana Jones, Ruia Aperahama and Horomona Horo. Yates had previously created similar projects as tributes to New Zealand poets James K. Baxter and Hone Tuwhare, and chose Ihimaera for her third project because he was "a writer with a huge body of work that I can give to a number of musicians for them to put their heart and soul to".

== Awards and honours ==
In the 1986 Queen's Birthday Honours, Ihimaera was awarded the Queen's Service Medal for public services. In the 2004 Queen's Birthday Honours, he was appointed a Distinguished Companion of the New Zealand Order of Merit, for services to literature. In 2009, following the restoration of titular honours by the New Zealand government, he declined redesignation as a Knight Companion of the New Zealand Order of Merit.

In 2004, Ihimaera received an honorary doctorate from Victoria University of Wellington. In the same year, he undertook a residency in world literature at George Washington University, funded by Fulbright New Zealand. In 2009 he was one of five recipients of the Arts Foundation of New Zealand Laureate Award, for which he received NZ$50,000. In the same year he received the prestigious Māori arts award Te Tohutiketike a Te Waka Toi at the 2009 Creative New Zealand Te Waka Toi Awards. The award is made to artists who are "exemplary in their chosen field of artistic endeavour". On receiving the award, Ihimaera said it was a recognition of his iwi: "Without them, I would have nothing to write about and there would be no Ihimaera. So this award is for all those ancestors who have made us all the people we are. It is also for the generations to come, to show them that even when you aren't looking, destiny has a job for you to do."

In 2017, Ihimaera was awarded a Prime Minister's Award for Literary Achievement. The selection panel described him "as one of New Zealand's most important post-colonial writers, who has consistently proved to be an outstanding storyteller, celebrated as a voice for Māoritanga and a literary leader". In the same year, he was appointed a Chevalier of the Ordre des Arts et des Lettres on Bastille Day by the French government for his "pivotal role in bringing Maori storytelling to the forefront and enabling its international recognition as a taonga from New Zealand". In 2024, he was elected as a Royal Society of Literature International Writer. He became an Arts Foundation of New Zealand Te Tumu Toi Icon in the 2026 awards.

== Selected works ==
=== Novels, short-story collections and non-fiction ===
- Pounamu Pounamu (1972, short-story collection)
- Tangi (1973)
- Whanau (1974)
- The New Net Goes Fishing (1977, short-story collection)
- The Matriarch (1986)
- The Whale Rider (1987)
- Dear Miss Mansfield: a tribute to Kathleen Mansfield Beauchamp (1989, short-story collection)
- Bulibasha: King of the Gypsies (1994)
- Nights in the Gardens of Spain (1995)
- Te Kaieke Tohorā (Māori edition of The Whale Rider) (1995)
- Kingfisher Come Home: the complete Maori stories (1995, short-story collection)
- The Dream Swimmer (1997)
- The Uncle's Story (2000)
- Sky Dancer (2003)
- Ihimaera: His Best Stories (2003, short-story collection)
- Whanau II: The Anniversary Collection, or Band of Angels (2005)
- The Rope of Man, combining Tangi and its sequel The Return (2005)
- Ask at the Posts of the House (2007, short-story collection)
- The Trowenna Sea (2009)
- The Parihaka Woman (2011)
- The Thrill of Falling (2011, short-story collection)
- Māori Boy: A Memoir of Childhood (2014, memoir)
- Sleeps Standing Moetū (2017, novella, with Hemi Kelly)
- Native Son: A Writer's Memoir (2019, memoir)
- The Astromancer: The Rising of Matariki (2022)
- Te Kaikaukau / The Swimmer: i te ao o Te Reo (2026, memoir)

=== Anthologies and other edited works ===
- Into the World of Light, edited by Ihimaera and D.S. Long (1982)
- Te Ao Maramara Volume 1: Whakahuatanga o te rau (Reflections of Reality), selected and edited by Ihimaera, with contributing editors, Haare Williams, Irihapeti Ramsden and D.S. Long (1992)
- Te Ao Maramara Volume 2: He whakaatanga o te ao (The Reality) (1992)
- Te Ao Maramara Volume 3: Puawaitanga o te korero (The Flowering) (1993)
- Regaining Aotearoa: Māori writers speak out, edited by Ihimaera, D.S. Long, Irihapeti Ramsden and Haare Williams (1993)
- Te Ao Maramara Volume 4: Te ara o te hau (The Path of the Wind) (1994)
- Vision Aotearoa = Kaupapa New Zealand (1994)
- 100 Lovers of Taamaki Makaurau, edited by Ihimaera and Albert Wendt (1994)
- Te Ao Maramara Volume 5: Te Torino (The Spiral) (1996)
- Mataora = the living face: contemporary art (1996)
- Growing up Māori (1998)
- Where's Waari: a history of the Maori through the short story (2000)
- Te Ata: Māori art from the East Coast, New Zealand, edited by Ihimaera and Ngarino Ellis, afterword by Katerina Te Heikōkō Mataira (2002)
- Auckland: the city in literature (2003)
- Get on the Waka: best recent Māori fiction (2007)
- Black Marks on the White Page, edited by Ihimaera and Tina Makereti (2017)
- Ngā Kupu Wero, edited by Ihimaera and with an introduction by Jacinta Ruru (2024)

=== Other works ===
- Maori (1975, pamphlet)
- New Zealand Through the Arts: past and present (1982, lecture)
- Waituhi: the life of the village, by Ihimaera (libretto) and Ross Harris (composer) (1984, opera)
- The Clio Legacy, by Ihimaera (libretto) and Dorothy Buchanan (1991, cantata)
- Tanz Der Schwane, Ihimaera (libretto) and Ross Harris (composer) (1993, opera)
- The Two Taniwha (1994, play)
- Symphonic Legends, Ihimaera (text) and Peter Scholes (composer) (1996)
- Land, Sea and Sky, Ihimaera (text) and Holger Leue (photographs) (1994)
- Legendary Land, Ihimaera (text) and Holger Leue (photographs), with a foreword by Keri Hulme (1994)
- Faces of the Land, Ihimaera (text) and Holger Leue (photographs) (1995)
- Beautiful New Zealand, Ihimaera (text) and Holger Leue (photographs) (1997)
- Beautiful North Island of New Zealand, Ihimaera (text) and Holger Leue (photographs) (1997)
- Beautiful South Island of New Zealand, Ihimaera (text) and Holger Leue (photographs) (1997)
- This is New Zealand, Ihimaera and Tim Plant (text) and Holger Leue (photographs) (1998)
- On Top Down Under: photographs of unique New Zealanders, Ihimaera (text) and Sally Tagg (photographs) (1998)
- New Zealand: first to see the dawn, Ihimaera (text) and Holger Leue (photographs) (1999)
- Woman Far Walking (2000, play)
- Galileo, by Ihimaera (libretto) and John Rimmer (composer) (2002, opera)
- The Wedding, with choreographer Mark Baldwin and composer Gareth Farr (2006, ballet)
- The Amazing Adventures of Razza the Rat (2006, children's book)
- Navigating the Stars: Māori Creation Myths (2020)

=== Adaptations ===
- "Big Brother, Little Sister", an episode from the 1976 anthology television series Winners & Losers was adapted by Roger Simpson.
- Whale Rider, a 2002 drama film was adapted from The Whale Rider by Niki Caro.
- Kawa, a 2010 film was adapted from Nights in the Gardens of Spain by Kate McDermott.
- White Lies, a 2013 film was adapted from Medicine Woman by Dana Rotberg.
- Mahana, a 2013 film was adapted from Bulibasha: King of the Gypsies by John Collee.

== See also ==
- List of honorary doctors of Victoria University of Wellington
- New Zealand literature
- Taniwha – Ihimaera noted a taniwha guarding him.
