= Ruapani =

Ruapani was a rangatira (chief) of the Māori in Tūranganui-a-Kiwa (the Poverty Bay-region on the East Coast of New Zealand) in the 15th and 16th century.

He is said to have been the paramount chief of all the Tūranganui-a-Kiwa tribes around 1525. His influence was large, it extended into the Ruakituri Valley and the Whakapūnaki district as far as the Huiarau Range beyond Lake Waikaremoana.

== Whakapapa ==
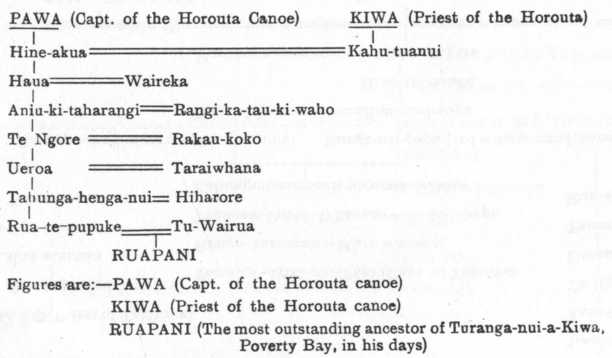
Whakapapa of Ruapani

The aristocratic lines of descent from Pawa and Kiwa of the Horouta waka converged upon Ruapani and his rule was undisputed.

His whakapapa is shown in two images:

1. the first image showing his descent from Pawa, the captain of the Horouta waka and Kiwa, priest of the Horouta, who is also known as the navigator.

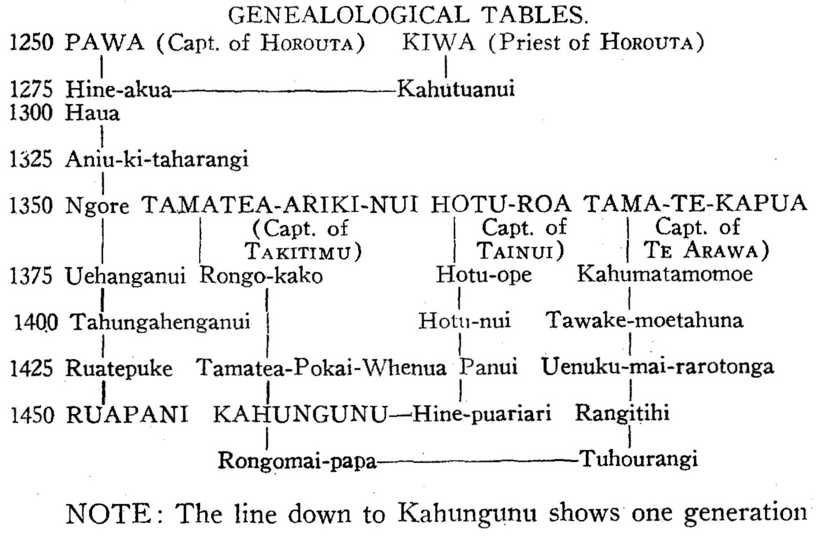

1. In the second image his estimated date of birth is shown.

Mackay gives a slightly different version of the history, resuming an address by Captain W. T. Pitt to the Rotary Club of Gisborne in 1934. When “the Tākitimu waka called in at Nukutaurua (Māhia Peninsula), The captain (Kiwa) left the waka and, with a small party, set off overland for Turanga (Poverty Bay). There he met Pawa, Horouta's captain. To celebrate the occasion they agreed that Kahutuanui (Kiwa's son) should wed Hine-a-Kua (Pawa's daughter). The descendants of this illustrious couple married with the issue of Paikea (who was reputed to have journeyed to New Zealand on the back of a whale); with those of Maia (who was said to have crossed the seas on a gourd), and with the Toi people. When the seventh generation was reached, the head chief was Ruapani, in whom converged all the lines of Maori greatness.”

Ruapani is also said to be descendant from Hine Hikirirangi, the sister of Pawa. She was the ancestor who nurtured the kūmara (sweet potato) she had brought from Hawaiki in her sacred basket.

== Popoia ==
Ruapani lived in his pā, Popoia, near Waituhi, some 20 km north west of Tūranga-nui-a-Kiwa (Now known as Gisborne). He had three wives; in order, Wairau, Uenukukōihu and Rongomaipāpā. When Ruapani died, Tūhourangi took Rongomaipāpā as his wife and founded the Tuhourangi iwi in Rotorua, which is also part of the Te Arawa confederation of tribes.

Popoia is located north of Waituhi and is adjacent to Lavenham Road. The site is still visible today but is located on private farmland.

Mitiri writes extensively about Kahungunu, “one of the most amazing characters in Māori history”, who once visited a pā on Titirangi (now known as Kaiti Hill), where “Kahungunu saw the smoke of the fires of a large settlement inland on the opposite side of the Waipaoa River. On asking who was living there, he was told that the pa was Popoia, owned by Ruapani, the principal chief of the whole district. So to Popoia our hero journeyed, and was so well thought of that Ruapani gave him his daughter Rua-rere-tai as wife. Kahungunu settled in the pa, and doubtless became a useful fellow. Time passed on until Rua-rere-tai was about to give birth to a child and she was desirous of something tasty with which to vary her diet. She asked her husband to procure some birds for her to eat in order to cause the milk to flow for his (as yet unborn) child. On reaching the forest he found a nest of a tieke in a hollow tree, from which he obtained some young birds. He took them to the village and cooked them, thus fulfilling his wife's desire. Not long after, the child, a girl, was born, and was named Rua-herehere-tieke, thus commemorating the finding of the young birds.”

== Legacy ==
Ruapani’s legacy is evident in the whakapapa (genealogy) lines of all the tribes in the Tūranganui-a-Kiwa district. With the emergence of these tribes — including, Te Aitanga-a-Māhaki, Rongowhakaata and Ngāi Tāmanuhiri — Ruapani’s influence began to wane and he retreated inland to the home of his relations in the Lake Waikaremoana area, where he lived out his days. Upon his death Ruapani was interred in a sacred cave called Kohurau at Whare Kōrero in the Wainui Beach area. A number of hapū today still identify themselves as Ngāti Ruapani, including those in the Whakapūnaki area through to Lake Waikaremoana and the people of Ōhako Marae in Manutuke.

“Ruapani had three wives and, in all, twenty-five children. Among those who could claim descent from him were Te Kani-a-Takirau, Heuheu, Te Rauparaha, Tomoana, Te Kooti, Wi Pere, Sir J. Carroll, Sir Maui Pomare, Sir A. T. Ngata, and other prominent Maori leaders”.

== Literature ==
- Mackay, Joseph Angus – Historic Poverty Bay and the East Coast, N.I., N.Z. Gisborne 1949; online available in New Zealand Electronic Text Centre (NZETC)
- Mitira, Tikia Hikawera (John Hikawera Mitchell) - Takitimu (1944 / Wellington 1972); online available in NZETC - especially Chapter 2
