= Ngāti Ruapani =

Māori iwi (tribe) in Aotearoa New Zealand

- Iwi (tribe) in Māoridom
- Waka (canoe): Tākitimu

Ngāti Ruapani or Ngāti Ruapani ki Waikaremoana is a Māori iwi of northern Hawke's Bay and the southern Gisborne District in New Zealand. They take their name from the ancestor Ruapani, who lived at the Popoia pā on the Waipaoa River near Waituhi in the 15th and 16th century. The main centre for the tribe is now the Lake Waikaremoana area.

Ngāti Tūtekohe was an iwi of the Gisborne District in New Zealand, who took their name from Tutekohi, a descendant of Ruapani.

== See also ==
- List of iwi
