= William Carran =

New Zealand assistant commissioner of police (1898–1960)

William Carran MBE (3 August 1898 – 1 October 1960) was a New Zealand policeman and assistant commissioner of police. He was born on 3 August 1898.

In the 1958 Queen's Birthday Honours, Carran was appointed a Member of the Order of the British Empire.
