= Nell Rose =

New Zealand hospital matron (1907–1996)

Ellen Alma Rose MBE (27 April 1907 – 17 July 1996) was a notable New Zealand clerk, nurse, nursing administrator and hospital matron. She was born in Riverton, New Zealand, in 1907.

In the 1958 Queen's Birthday Honours, Rose was appointed a Member of the Order of the British Empire.
