= Leslie Grange =

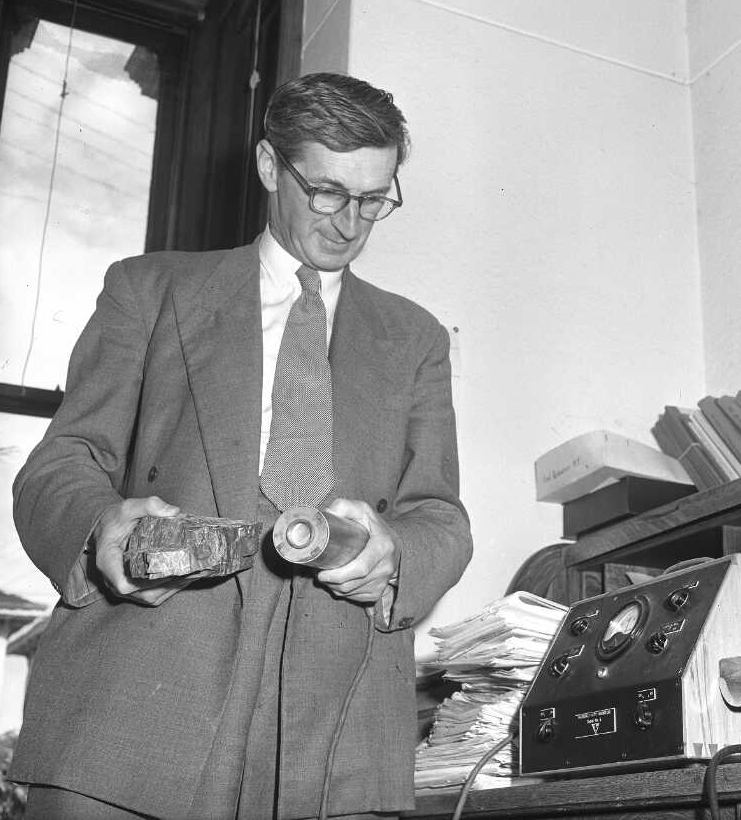
Grange in 1954

Leslie Issott Grange ISO (4 March 1894 – 6 October 1980) was a New Zealand geologist, soil scientist and scientific administrator. He was foundation director of the Soil Bureau.

In the 1958 Queen's Birthday Honours, Grange was appointed a Companion of the Imperial Service Order.
