= Norman Taylor (scientist) =

New Zealand teacher, soil scientist, scientific administrator (1900–1975)

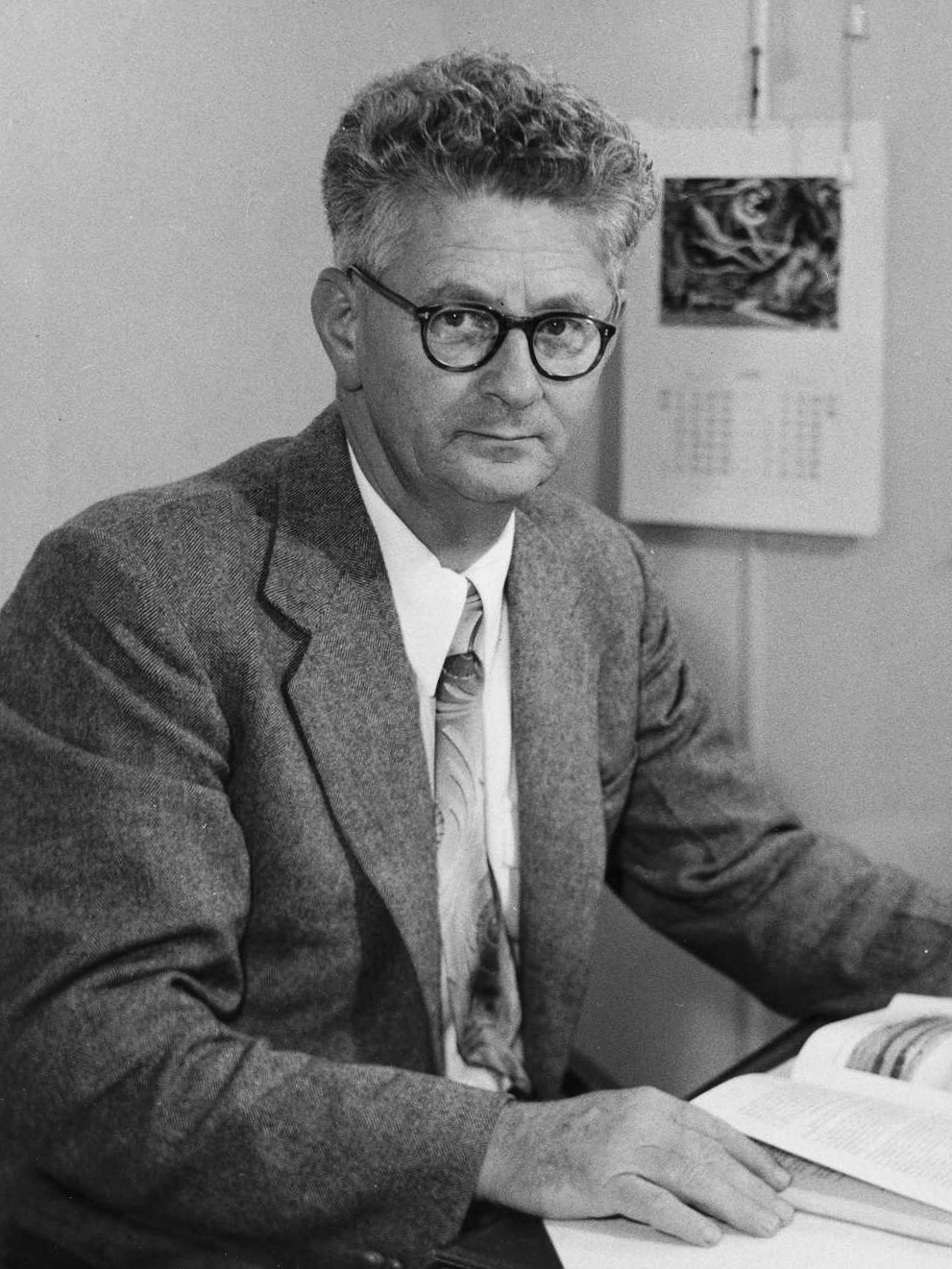
Taylor in 1955

Norman Hargrave Taylor OBE (9 June 1900 – 25 October 1975) was a New Zealand teacher, soil scientist and scientific administrator. He was born in Auckland, New Zealand, in 1900. He was the director of the Soil Bureau and was appointed an Officer of the Order of the British Empire in the 1960 Queen's Birthday Honours.

In 1968 he was awarded the Mueller Medal by the Australian and New Zealand Association for the Advancement of Science.

The New Zealand Society of Soil Science awards the annual Normal Taylor Memorial Award for Outstanding Contributions to Soil Science (also called the Norman Taylor Memorial Lecture) in his honour.
