= Estelle Beere =

New Zealand dance teacher

Estelle Girda Beere OBE (23 July 1875 – 20 September 1959) was a New Zealand dancing teacher. She was born in Wanganui, New Zealand, on 23 July 1875.

Beere studied ballet in London and returned to New Zealand around 1899. She had a 60 year career teaching dance in Wellington.

In the 1958 Queen's Birthday Honours, Beere was appointed an Officer of the Order of the British Empire, for services as a teacher of dancing over many years.
