= Frederick Page (musician) =

University professor of music, pianist, critic

Frederick Joseph Page (1905–1983) was a New Zealand university professor of music, pianist and critic. He was instrumental in the promotion of contemporary classical music in New Zealand.

== Early life ==
Page was born on 4 December 1905 in Lyttelton, Canterbury, New Zealand.

== Music Studies ==
From 1920, he studied with Ernest Empson in Christchurch, and from 1935 to 1938 in London at the Royal College of Music. Among his teachers there was Ralph Vaughan Williams.

== Teaching ==
Back in New Zealand he married painter Evelyn Page in 1938 and settled in Governors Bay.

In 1945/46, Page established the music department at Victoria University College in Wellington where he taught until his retirement in 1971.

In 1950 Page was one of the founders of the New Zealand branch of the International Society for Contemporary Music in Wellington. A transformatory experience was Page's visit in 1958 of the Darmstadt International Summer Courses for New Music and the Donaueschingen Festival in Germany. He became a personal friend of composer Pierre Boulez whose work Page promoted in New Zealand.

In 1960, Page visited China and in 1982 he taught at the Shanghai Conservatorium.

In 1970, he received his only official recognition with an order of merit by the government of Poland.

He died on 29 November 1983 in Wellington.
