= Waituhi =

Small settlement in the Gisborne District of New Zealand's North Island

- Interactive map of Waituhi
- Coordinates: 38°35′S 177°54′E
- Country: New Zealand
- Region: Gisborne District
- Ward: Tairāwhiti General Ward
- Electorates: East Cape; Ikaroa-Rāwhiti (Māori)

Government
  - Territorial authority: Gisborne District Council
  - Mayor of Gisborne: Rehette Stoltz
  - East Cape MP: Dana Kirkpatrick
  - Ikaroa-Rāwhiti MP: Cushla Tangaere-Manuel
- Time zone: UTC+12 (NZST)
  - Summer (DST): UTC+13 (NZDT)
- Postcode: 4072
- Area code: 06

Waituhi is a small settlement in the Gisborne District of New Zealand's North Island. It is 21 km (13 mi) northwest of the city of Gisborne, on the western bank of the Waipaoa River. It is notable as the historic site of Popoia pā, and as the setting for several novels and short stories of Witi Ihimaera. Members of the Te Whānau-a-Kai Te Aitanga-a-Māhaki iwi (tribe) are the tangata whenua (“the people of the land”). In 2009 a project to develop a community drinking water supply was started.

== History ==
=== Ruapani ===
Ruapani was regarded as the paramount chief of all the Tūranganui-a-Kiwa tribes around 1525. His influence also extended widely around the region. It is said that the aristocratic lines of descent from Pāoa and Kiwa of the Horouta waka converged upon him and his rule was undisputed. Ruapani lived at a pā, Popoia, near Waituhi.

He had three wives. His first wife was Wairau. His second wife was Uenukukōihu and his third wife was Rongomaipāpā, who was a daughter of Kahungunu and Rongomaiwahine. When Ruapani died, Tūhourangi took Rongomaipāpā as his wife and founded the present Tūhourangi tribe in Rotorua, which is part of the Te Arawa confederation of tribes. The importance of Ruapani is clearly shown in the whakapapa (genealogy) lines of all the tribes in the Tūranganui-a-Kiwa district. With the emergence of these tribes, like Te Aitanga-a-Māhaki, Rongowhakaata and Ngāi Tāmanuhiri – Ruapani's influence began to wane and he retreated inland to the home of his relations in the Lake Waikaremoana area, where he lived out his days. Ngāti Ruapani still consider themselves the descendants of Ruapani.

== Rongopai ==
Rongopai is a great painted wharenui (meeting house) built at Waituhi for Te Kooti in 1887 by the Whānau-a-Kair hapū of the Te Aitanga-a-Māhaki iwi. Local leader and politician Wi Pere was part of the process in creating the wharenui. Rongopai has paintings rather than carvings and is significant to Māori art because of this. Eria Tutara-Kauika Raukura (1834/5 – 1938), the leading tohunga of the Ringatū church, founded by Te Kooti, became a guardian of Rongopai in 1913, and he was still active there as a guardian and tohunga in the mid-1920s.

Another marae at Waituhi is Pakohai.

Another marae at Waituhi is Takitimu.

== Witi Ihimaera ==
Waituhi is the setting of several of Witi Ihimaera's novels, including Tangi (1973), The Matriarch (1986), Bulibasha, King of the Gypsies (1994) and Band of Angels (2005).

As Millar states, much of Ihimaera's fiction is based on fact, but his work is never simply autobiographical. Waituhi, for example, the village setting for many of his narratives, is an imaginative recreation of the actual place. The fictional Waituhi's ‘physical cohesion [providing] an "objective correlative" to the ethos that binds the tangata whenua together’.

== Opera ==
Waituhi – The Life of the Village was an opera with music from Ross Harris; libretto by Witi Ihimaera. This four-act opera is based on the novel Whanau and is the story of the writer's life in an East Coast (New Zealand) village. It is scored for 23 soloists, chorus, and full orchestra. The opera was first performed at the State Opera House in Wellington in 1984.

== Different meanings of 'Waituhi' in Māori ==
Waituha has some different meanings in Māori:

- A waituhi was a pool of water or bird trough with fixed snares over it.
- or: freshet, first signs of water in a stream.
- Waituhi can also mean: to perform certain rites over a woman at or after childbirth; or
- to perform rites over a child at the cutting of the navel-string.
- Waituhi can also mean: red.

== Literature ==
- Murton, Brian J. (1979) - Waituhi: A Place in Maori New Zealand. in: New Zealand Geographer. Vol. 35 Issue 1, pp. 24–33.

Media related to Waituhi at Wikimedia Commons
