= Peter Mulgrew =

New Zealand adventurer (1927–1979)

Peter Mulgrew BEM
- Born: Peter David Mulgrew; 21 November 1927; Lower Hutt, New Zealand
- Died: 28 November 1979 (aged 52); Mount Erebus, Antarctica
- Occupations: Mountaineer; yachtsman; businessman
- Spouse: June Martha Anderson (m. 1952)
- Children: 2

Peter David Mulgrew BEM (21 November 1927 – 28 November 1979) was a New Zealand mountaineer, yachtsman and businessman.

== Life and career ==
Mulgrew was born in Lower Hutt to boilermaker William John Mulgrew and woollen industry worker Edith Mulgrew (née Matthews). He attended the Hutt Valley Memorial Technical College. He served in the Royal New Zealand Navy for eleven years, including service on a frigate in the Korean War. On 20 September 1952, in Wellington, he married June Martha Anderson. They had two daughters, Robyn and Susan.

He embarked on several expeditions with Edmund Hillary: the 1956–1958 Commonwealth Trans-Antarctic Expedition to the South Pole on which he served as radio operator; the 1960–61 Silver Hut expedition, a scientific and mountaineering expedition (plus Yeti hunt) to the Himalayas, on which he suffered pulmonary edema at 27,450 feet (8,370 m) on Makalu. Mulgrew had to be carried part-way by a Sherpa (Urkien). He was an "appalling sight" and "it was a miracle he was still alive". A helicopter took him from the Barun Valley (15,000 feet (4,600 m)) to Shanta Bhawan Hospital in Kathmandu. Hillary was horrified when he saw him and got his wife June to fly to Nepal. As a result of the pulmonary edema Mulgrew suffered frostbite to both his feet which after his repatriation to New Zealand had to be amputated.

Later he went on a 1964 Himalayan schoolhouse expedition, and a 1966 Himalayan hospital expedition. He also climbed in the Swiss Alps, ascending the Matterhorn.

In the 1958 Queen's Birthday Honours, he was awarded the British Empire Medal.

He represented New Zealand in the world One Ton yachting championships in Sydney in 1972 and sailed around Cape Horn the next year.

He was group general manager of Alex Harvey Industries, Auckland and served on the boards of AHI Aluminium and elsewhere. Outside of commerce, he was a member of the Himalayan Trust Board and the Spirit of Adventure Trust Board.

== Death ==
Mulgrew was killed on 28 November 1979 in the crash of Air New Zealand Flight 901 at Mount Erebus on a sightseeing flight to Antarctica, in which all 257 on board died. He was a commentator on the flight, having replaced his close friend Sir Edmund Hillary, who was on a scheduled speaking tour of the United States. In 1989 his widow, June, married Hillary.

== Honorific eponym ==
The Mulgrew Nunatak in Antarctica is named in Mulgrew's honour.

== Works ==
- No Place for Men (Reed, Wellington, 1964, also 1965, 1975)
- I Hold the Heights (Doubleday, New York, 1965)
- Gentleman’s Magellan: A voyage of re-discovery around Cape Horn from notes by Peter Mulgrew, Ken Mulgrew's log and Wally Romanes' diary; edited by Bruce Harvey (Morris-Cobb, Auckland, 1974)
