= Ernest Empson =

New Zealand pianist and piano teacher (1880–1970)

Ernest Charles Empson OBE (9 March 1880 – 23 June 1970) was a New Zealand pianist and piano teacher. He was born in Ashburton, New Zealand, on 9 March 1880.

In the 1958 Queen's Birthday Honours, Empson was appointed an Officer of the Order of the British Empire, in recognition of his service as president of the New Zealand Registered Music Teachers' Association.
