= Mount Haslop =

Mountain in Antarctica

Mount Haslop (80°36′S 30°16′W) is a mountain, 760 metres (2,500 ft) high, which stands 2 nautical miles (4 km) south of Mount Lowe at the western extremity of the Shackleton Range in Antarctica. It was first mapped in 1957 by the Commonwealth Trans-Antarctic Expedition (CTAE) and named for Flight Lieutenant Gordon M. Haslop, Royal New Zealand Air Force (1922–1961), New Zealand second pilot of the Royal Air Force contingent of the CTAE in 1956–58.
