= Soil Bureau =

Former New Zealand research institute

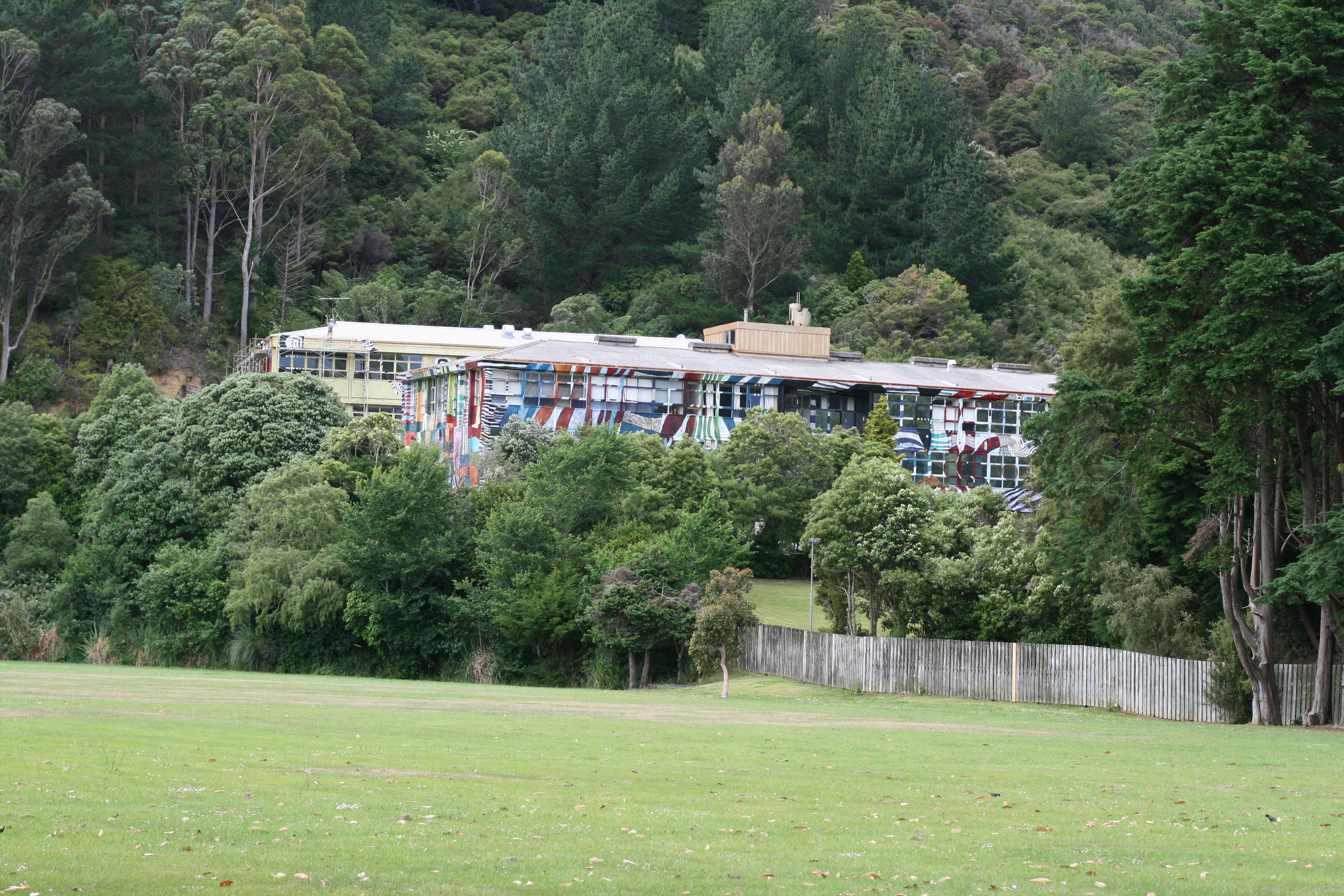
The campus that Soil Bureau built, currently occupied by The Learning Connexion, a private tertiary institution, with Taita College fields in foreground

New Zealand Soil Bureau (1936-1992) was a division of the Department of Scientific and Industrial Research specializing in soil-related research and development. Originally formed as the 'soil survey group' of the 'Geological Survey,' they became the 'Soil Survey Division' in 1936 and 'Soil Bureau' in 1945. Established adjacent to Taita College on approximately 90 acres on the Eastern Hills of Lower Hutt north of Wellington, the foyer featured a large mural by Ernest Mervyn Taylor depicting a cloaked figure using a kō (Māori digging stick). Soil Bureau completed nationwide soil surveys of New Zealand.

The impetus for forming a separate unit related to soil science was work in the 1930s by Leslie Grange and Norman Taylor which showed a correspondence between soil type and bush sickness in cattle, which led to the discovery that ash-based soils in the central North Island were Cobalt deficient and that cobalt-enriched salt licks could open up tens of thousands of acres to dairy farming.

Soil Bureau was renamed as DSIR Land Resources in 1990 and then reformed into Landcare Research in 1992 by the Crown Research Institutes Act 1992, but the name remains protected under the Flags, Emblems, and Names Protection Act 1981. Many Soil Bureau publications were digitised by its successor organisation.

== Directors ==
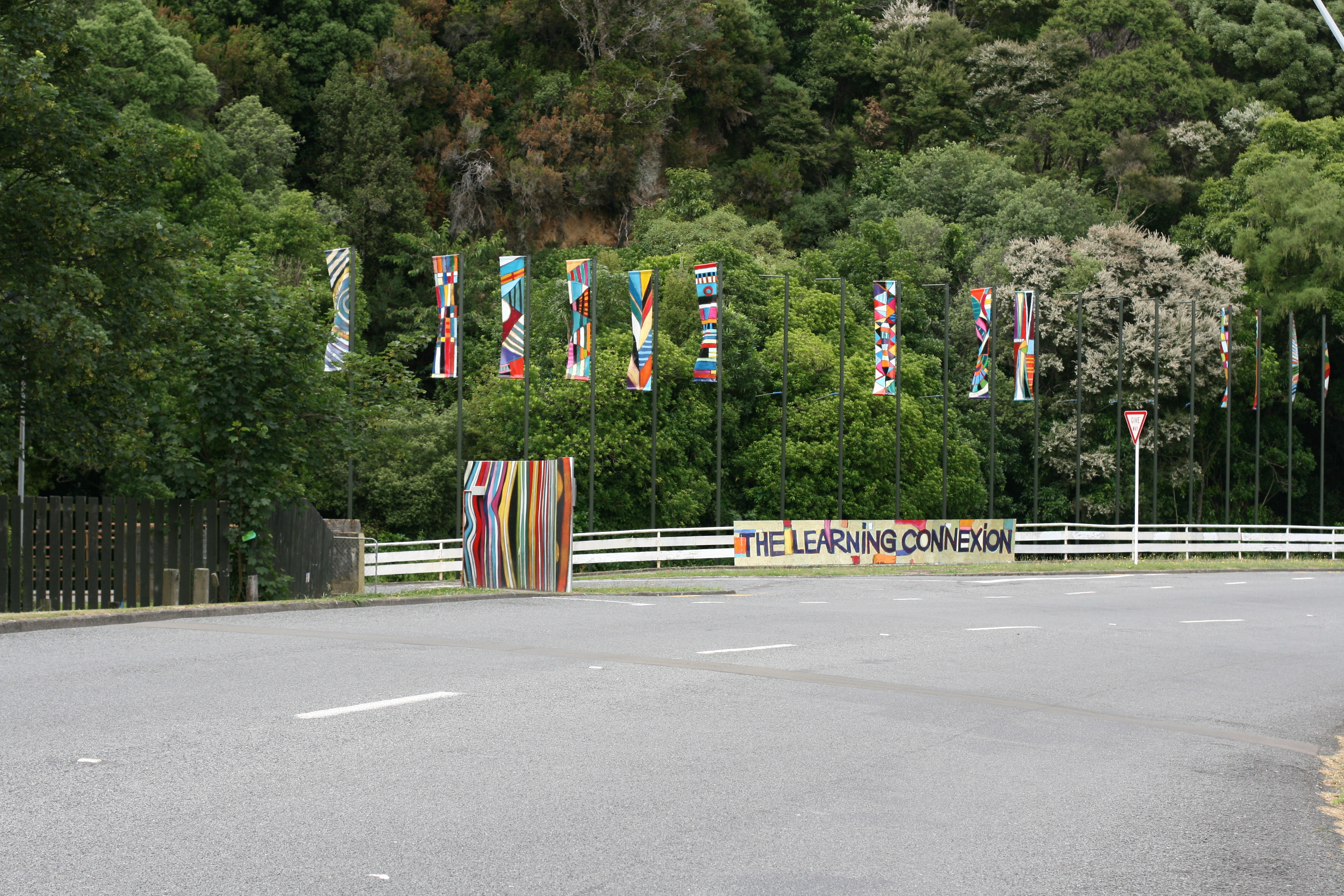
The entranceway to the Taita campus from Eastern Hutt Road.

- Leslie Grange 1936–1952
- Norman Taylor 1952–1962
- Joseph Dixon 1962–1966
- Morice Fieldes 1966–1973
- Bruce Miller 1973–
- Mike L. Leamy –1987
- Derek Milne 1987–
