= Holmes Miller =

New Zealand surveyor, explorer and conservationist (1919–1986)

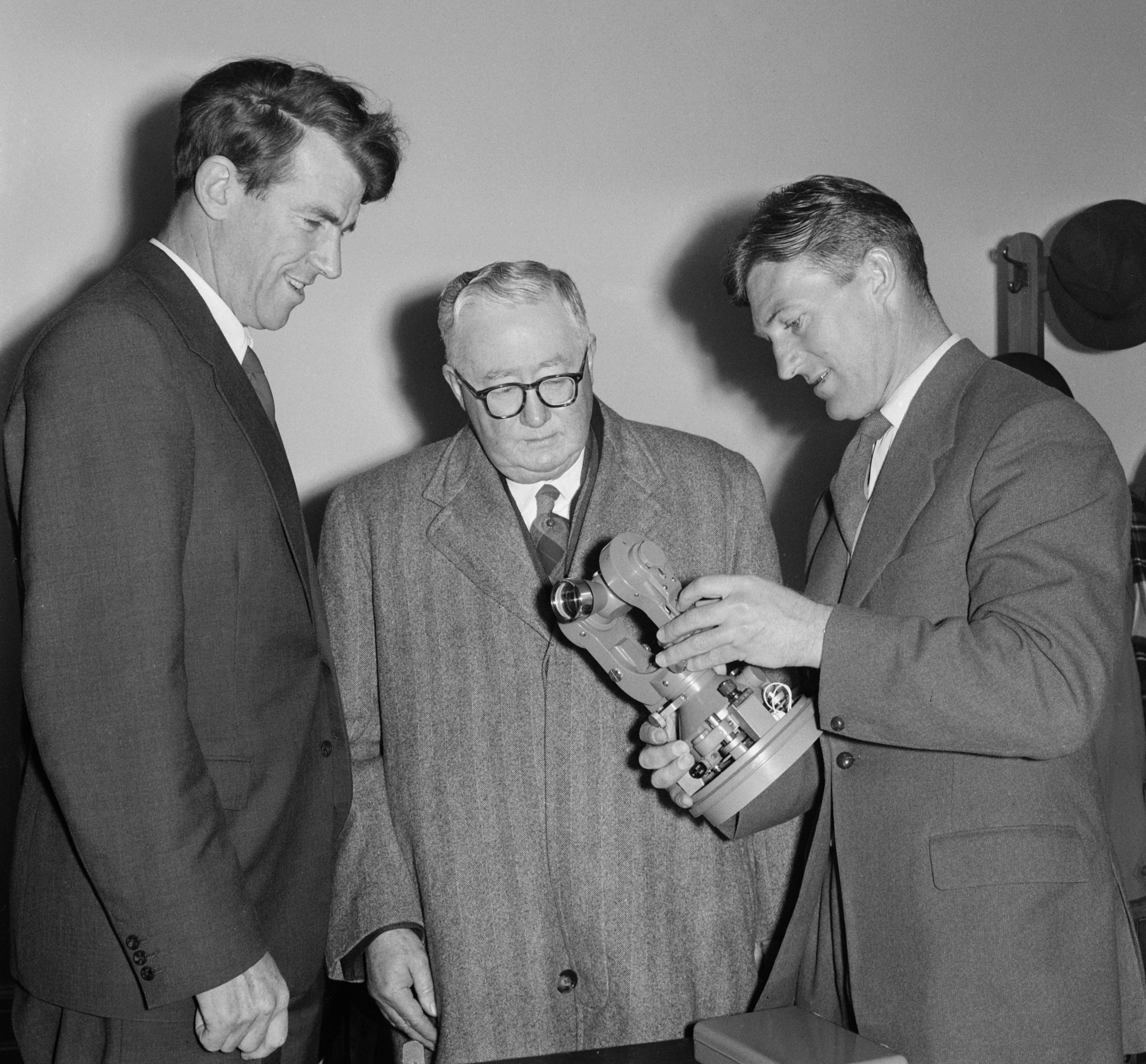
Miller with Sir Edmund Hillary (left) and Sir William Appleton (centre) in 1956

Sir Joseph Holmes Miller OBE (12 February 1919 – 6 February 1986) was a New Zealand surveyor, Antarctic explorer and conservationist. He was born in Waimate on 12 February 1919.

Miller was the leader of the survey team (which also comprised Robert Dick, Ralph Moir, and R. Litt) on the 1949 New Zealand American Fiordland Expedition.

In May 1958, Miller was awarded the Polar Medal, and a month later in the 1958 Queen's Birthday Honours, he was appointed an Officer of the Order of the British Empire, in recognition of his role as deputy leader of the New Zealand Trans-Antarctic Expedition. In the 1979 New Year Honours, he was knighted as a Knight Bachelor, for services to the Ross Dependency, conservation and surveying.

The Miller Range in Antarctica is named in his honour.
