= Vincent Aspey =

New Zealand musician (1909–1987)

Vincent Aspey MBE (5 January 1909 – 18 April 1987) was a violinist, born in England, but raised in New Zealand, who rose to the rank of the first violinist of the New Zealand Symphony Orchestra. In his later life, he taught violin to students, even those less willing, of the Raumati and Paraparaumu Colleges of New Zealand. Notable amongst his many abilities, was a tremendous ability for sight-reading, which undoubtedly helped him impart his knowledge of the violin, as all pieces were accessible to him, so that he could quickly absorb a piece, then suggest, according to his own musicality and experience, how it could be played, and how the piece could improve a player's own musicality.

His concert violin was a Guarneri, with a deeper and less brilliant tone than a Stradivari. He also played the viola, to approximately the same standard he played the violin. Vincent was about 5'8" but had good long fingers. His wife was an accomplished cellist.

Aspey attended New South Wales State Conservatorium from August 1928 to February 1929. In the 1958 Queen's Birthday Honours, he was appointed a Member of the Order of the British Empire, for services to music, especially to the National Orchestra. Victoria University of Wellington awarded him an honorary doctorate in 1974.

== Personal life ==
Aspey was born in Hindley, Lancashire, on 5 January 1909. His father was Thomas Aspey, a coalminer, and his mother was Alice Berry, Thomas's wife. He had an older brother. The family moved to Huntly, New Zealand in 1911, and Aspey later attended Huntly School.

He married Elspeth Jean Clarkson in Auckland on 7 January 1939, and they had two sons. He died in Raumati on 18 April 1987.
