= Department of Scientific and Industrial Research (New Zealand) =

New Zealand government agency, 1926–1992

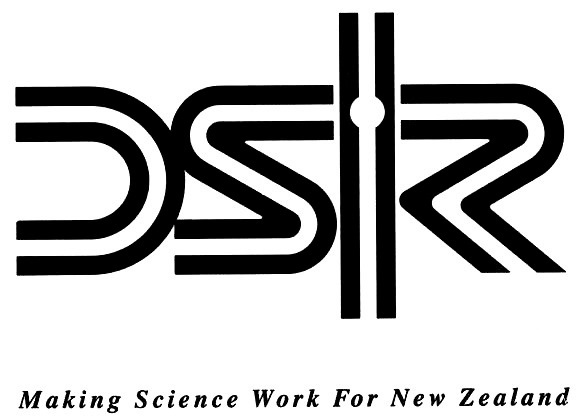
- DSIR logo in the 1980s and 1990s

Agency overview
- Formed: 1926
- Preceding agencies: Geological Survey; Magnetic Survey; Meteorological Office; Hector Observatory; Samoan Scientific Service
- Dissolved: 1 April 1992
- Superseding agency: 10 semi-independent Crown Research Institutes
- Employees: 2,000 in 1976
- Minister responsible: Minister for Scientific and Industrial Research

The Department of Scientific and Industrial Research (DSIR) was a government science agency in New Zealand, founded in 1926 and broken into Crown Research Institutes in 1992.

== History ==
DSIR was founded in 1926 by Ernest Marsden after calls from Ernest Rutherford for government to support education and research and on the back of the Imperial Economic Conference in London in October and November 1923, when various colonies discussed setting up such departments. It initially received funding from sources such as the Empire Marketing Board. The initial plans also included a new agricultural college, to be jointly founded by Auckland and Victoria University Colleges, Palmerston North was chosen as the site for this and it grew to become Massey University.

It was reconstituted into 10 semi-independent entities called Crown Research Institutes by the Crown Research Institutes Act 1992, with some further consolidation since.

== Structure ==
DSIR initially had five divisions:

- Grasslands in Palmerston North
- Plant Diseases in Auckland
- Entomology, attached to the Cawthron Institute in Nelson
- Soil Survey (later Soil Bureau) in Taita
- Agronomy (later Crop Research Division) in Lincoln

The Grasslands Division originally included the New Zealand Dairy Research Institute, which became the Fonterra Research and Development Centre in 2001.

The Geophysics Division was established in 1951.

The Antarctic Division was established in 1959 and became Antarctica New Zealand in 1996.

== List of directors-general ==
The directors-general (chief executives) of DSIR were:

- Ernest Marsden – 1926 to 1947
- Frank Callaghan – 1947 to 1953
- Bill Hamilton – 1953 to 1971
- Eddie Robertson – 1971 to 1980
- Bruce Miller – 1980 to 1984
- Jim Ellis – 1984 to 1989
- Mike Collins – 1989 to 1994

== See also ==
- Category:People associated with Department of Scientific and Industrial Research (New Zealand) (75)

== Works cited ==
- Galbreath, Ross (1998). DSIR: Making Science Work for New Zealand: Themes from the History of the Department of Scientific and Industrial Research, 1926–1992. Wellington [NZ]: Victoria University Press. ISBN 0864733542. OCLC 44633299.
