= Trevor Hatherton =

Geophysicist, scientific administrator, Antarctic scientist (1924–1992)

Trevor Hatherton OBE (30 September 1924 – 2 May 1992) was a New Zealand geophysicist, scientific administrator and Antarctic scientist. He was born in Sharlston, Yorkshire, England, on 30 September 1924.

In the 1958 Queen's Birthday Honours, Hatherton was appointed an Officer of the Order of the British Empire.
