= The Practice of Everyday Life =

1980 book by Michel de Certeau

- Author: Michel de Certeau
- Original title: L'invention du quotidien
- Translator: Steven Rendall
- Language: French
- Publication date: 1980

The Practice of Everyday Life is a book by Michel de Certeau that examines the ways in which people individualise mass culture, altering things, from utilitarian objects to street plans to rituals, laws and language, in order to make them their own. It was originally published in French as L'invention du quotidien. Vol. 1, Arts de faire' (1980). The 1984 English translation is by Steven Rendall. The book is one of the key texts in the study of everyday life.

The Practice of Everyday Life re-examines related fragments and theories from Kant, Freud, and Wittgenstein to Bourdieu, Foucault and Détienne, in the light of a proposed theoretical model.

== Introductory chapter ==
The Practice of Everyday Life begins by pointing out that while social science possesses the ability to study the traditions, language, symbols, art and articles of exchange that make up a culture, it lacks a formal means by which to examine the ways in which people reappropriate them in everyday situations.

This is a dangerous omission, de Certeau argues, because in the activity of re-use lies an abundance of opportunities for ordinary people to subvert the rituals and representations that institutions seek to impose upon them.

With no clear understanding of such activity, social science is bound to create nothing other than a picture of people who are non-artists (meaning non-creators and non-producers), passive and heavily subject to received culture. Indeed, such a misinterpretation is borne out in the term "consumer". In the book, the word "user" is offered instead; the concept of "consumption" is expanded in the phrase "procedures of consumption" which then further transforms to "tactics of consumption".

This chapter positions the book by contrast to Michel Foucault's study of disciplines and micropolitics, Émile Durkheim, Erving Goffman, Pierre Bourdieu, Marcel Mauss, and Marcel Détienne's studies of ritual, Harold Garfinkel, Emanuel Schegloff, and William Labov's studies of ordinary language, David Lewis and Oswald Ducrot's philosophical studies of convention, and the analytic philosophy of Arthur Danto, Georg Henrik von Wright, and Richard J. Bernstein on action; Arthur Prior, Nicholas Rescher, and Alasdair Urquhart on time; and George Edward Hughes, Max Creswell, and Alan R. White on modality. He also links his project to the Chinese classic The Art of War and the Arabic anthology The Book of Tricks, and he closes the chapter with references to Sigmund Freud's Civilization and its Discontents and the novelist Witold Gombrowicz.

== Key arguments ==
The most influential aspect of The Practice of Everyday Life has emerged from scholarly interest in de Certeau’s distinction between the concepts of strategy and tactics. De Certeau defines "strategies" as the hidden means in which institutions and structures of power, or "producers", circumscribe a place as proper and generate relations with targeted individuals, or "consumers", who consequently enact "tactics" in order to unsettle or diverge from the prescribed conventions of such environments.

In the influential chapter "Walking in the City", de Certeau asserts that the "'city' founded by utopian and urbanistic discourse" is generated by the strategies of governments, corporations, and other institutional bodies who produce things like maps that describe the city as a unified whole. De Certeau uses the vantage from the World Trade Center in New York to illustrate the idea of a panoptic, unified view. By contrast, the walker at street level moves in ways that are tactical and never fully determined by the plans of organizing bodies, taking shortcuts in spite of the strategic grid of the streets. This concretely illustrates de Certeau's argument that everyday life works by a process of poaching on the territory of others, using the rules and products that already exist in culture in a way that is influenced, but never wholly determined, by those rules and products.

According to Andrew Blauvelt, who relies on the work of de Certeau in his essay on design and everyday life:

Certeau's investigations into the realm of routine practices, or the 'arts of doing' such as walking, talking, reading, dwelling, and cooking, were guided by his belief that despite repressive aspects of modern society, there exists an element of creative resistance to these structures enacted by ordinary people. In The Practice of Everyday Life, de Certeau outlines an important critical distinction between strategies and tactics in this battle of repression and expression. According to him, strategies are used by those within organisational power structures, whether small or large, such as the state or municipality, the corporation or the proprietor, a scientific enterprise or the scientist. Strategies are deployed against some external entity to institute a set of relations for official or proper ends, whether adversaries, competitors, clients, customers, or simply subjects. Tactics, on the other hand, are employed by those who are subjugated. By their very nature tactics are defensive and opportunistic, used in more limited ways and seized momentarily within spaces, both physical and psychological, produced and governed by more powerful strategic relations.

== Sources ==
- de Certeau, Michel (1984). The Practice of Everyday Life. Translated by Rendall, Stephen F. University of California Press. ISBN 978-0-520-27145-6. OCLC 10122084.
- Cummings, Neil. Reading Things, Chance Books, London 1993.
- Giard, Luce. Keynote Speech at Victoria and Albert Museum for Civiccentre, 15 April 2003.
