= Wilf Malcolm =

New Zealand mathematician and university administrator

Wilf Malcolm CBE
- Born: Wilfred Gordon Malcolm; 29 November 1933; Feilding, New Zealand
- Died: 6 October 2018 (aged 84); Auckland, New Zealand
- Education: Wellington Teachers' College; Victoria University of Wellington
- Spouse: Edmée Ruth Prebensen (m. 1959)
- Scientific career
- Fields: Pure mathematics
- Workplaces: Victoria University of Wellington
- Thesis: Ultraproducts and higher order models (1972)
- Doctoral advisor: George Hughes; Max Cresswell; C.J. Seelye

Vice-Chancellor of the University of Waikato
- In office 1985–1994
- Preceded by: Don Llewellyn
- Succeeded by: Bryan Gould

Wilfred Gordon Malcolm CBE (29 November 1933 – 6 October 2018) was a New Zealand mathematician and university administrator. He was professor of pure mathematics at Victoria University of Wellington from the mid 1970s, until serving as vice-chancellor of the University of Waikato between 1985 and 1994.

== Biography ==
Born in Feilding on 29 November 1933, Malcolm was educated at Feilding Agricultural High School. He went on to study at Wellington Teachers' College and Victoria University College, graduating Master of Arts with first-class honours in 1957. He won a Shirtcliffe Fellowship, which enabled him to take parts II and III of the Mathematical Tripos, specialising in algebra and topology, at the University of Cambridge. While in England, Malcolm married Edmée Ruth Prebensen.

Malcolm returned to Victoria, where he took up a lecturership in pure mathematics. Between 1964 and 1966, he spent time away from the university, working as the general secretary of the Inter-Varsity Fellowship of Evangelical Unions. However, he returned to lecturing at Victoria in 1967, and was promoted to senior lecturer the following year. In 1972, he completed his PhD thesis, titled Ultraproducts and higher order models, supervised by George Hughes and Max Cresswell from the Department of Philosophy, and C.J. Seelye from the Mathematics Department.

In 1985, Malcolm moved to the University of Waikato to take up the vice-chancellorship, serving in that role until 1994.

Malcolm was awarded the New Zealand 1990 Commemoration Medal in 1990. In the 1994 Queen's Birthday Honours, he was appointed a Commander of the Order of the British Empire, for services to tertiary education. The following year, he was conferred with an honorary doctorate by the University of Waikato. The Wilf Malcolm Institute of Educational Research at Waikato was named in his honour in 2002, in recognition of his contribution to education.

Malcolm died in Auckland on 6 October 2018.

Academic offices
Preceded by Don Llewellyn	Vice-Chancellor of the University of Waikato; 1985–1994	Succeeded by Bryan Gould
