= Thomas Conley =

Thomas or Tom Conley may refer to:

- Tom Conley (American football), American football coach and player, basketball coach
- Tom Conley (philologist) (born 1943), American philologist

== See also ==
- Earl Thomas Conley (1941–2019), country music singer
