= Osmund Lewry =

English scholar (1929–1987)

Patrick Osmund Lewry (1929 – 1987) was an English Dominican who made significant contributions to the history of logic and the philosophy of language in the thirteenth century. Lewry studied mathematical logic under Lejewski and A.N. Prior at Manchester (1961–2). From 1962–7 he taught the philosophy of language and logic at Hawkesyard. He was assigned to the Oxford Blackfriars in 1967. Dissatisfaction with teaching led him to work for an Oxford D.Phil. on the logic teaching of Robert Kilwardby. In 1979 he began the study of the history of grammar, logic and rhetoric at Oxford in the period 1220–1320. In 1979 he went to the Pontifical Institute of Mediaeval Studies in Toronto first as a research associate, then as a senior fellow. He died on 23 April 1987 at the age of 57 at the Oxford Dominican House.

== Work ==
Lewry wrote multiple works on Kilwardby's works, and argued that Kilwardby influenced Roger Bacon's thoughts. In particular, Kilwardby is argued to have influenced Bacon's theories on epistemology. Also, Lewry specialized in identifying medieval sources and the attribution of authors for various manuscripts with a special focus on the works attributed to Kilwardby. In one instance, he provided evidence that the work Commenti super Priscianum Maiorem, previously attributed to Kilwardby, was not, in fact, written by the medieval thinker. Later critics have followed his lead and removed any attribution. Lewry was not limited to the works of Kilwardby; he also provided evidence regarding works attributed to Pseudo-Scotus.

== Selected works ==
- Theology of History, Mercier Press, 1969.
- The Commentary on 'Priscianus Maior' Ascribed to Robert Kilwardby. "The Problem of the authorship" CIMAGL 1975 Vol 15
- Robert Kilwardby's Writings on the Logica vetus Studied with Regard to Their Teaching and Method. Ph.D. diss. Oxford, 1978.
  - British Library: Microfilm. 35 mm.
  - Original: 442 leaves; 31 cm BLDSC reference no.: D26925/79 Bodleian Library Bookstack MS. D.Phil. c.2582 In place
- Lewry, Osmund: 1979, “The Commentaries of Simon of Faversham and ms. Merton College 288.” Bulletin de Philosophie Medievale 21, 73–80.
- Two Continuators of Aquinas: Robertus de Vulgarbia and Thomas Sutton on the Perihermeneias of Aristotle, Mediaeval Studies 43 (1981), 58–130
- Thirteenth-century examination compendia from the faculty of arts. (Université Catholique de Louvain : Publications de l'Institut d'études médiévales, 1982)
- 'The Oxford Condemnations of 1277 in Grammar and Logic', in English Logic and Semantics, ed. Braakhuis, Nijmegen 1981.
- 'Robert Kilwardby on meaning: a Parisian course on the Logica Vetus', in: J.P. Beckmann e.a. (Eds), Sprache und Erkenntnis im Mittelalter (Miscellanea medievalia, 13; W. de Gruyter, Berlin/New York 1981), 376-83
- 'Two Continuators of Aquinas: Robertus de Vulgarbia and Thomas Sutton on the Perihermenias of Aristotle', in: Medieval Studies, 43 (1981), 58–130.
- Robertus Anglicus and the Italian Kilwardby. (Bibliopolis, 1982)
- A Passiontide sermon of Robert Kilwardby, OP (Istituto storico Dominicano, 1982)
- Four graduation speeches from Oxford manuscripts, c. 1270–1310 (Pontifical Institute of Mediaeval Studies, 1982)
- (ed). "Robert Grosseteste's Question on Subsistence: An Echo of the Adamites," in Mediaeval Studies 45 (1983), 1–21. [Contains an edition of the short work De subsistentia rei.]
- “Oxford Logic 1250–1275: Nicholas and Peter of Cornwall,” in The Rise of British Logic, Toronto 1983, pp. 2–23.
- "Robert Kilwardby on Imagination: the Reconciliation of Aristotle and Augustine", Medioevo, IX, 1983: 1–42. (A clear account of Kilwarby's theories of soul and knowledge).
- 'Grammar, Logic and Rhetoric. 1220–1320', in: J.J. Catto (ed.), The History of the University of Oxford, I: The Early Oxford Schools (Oxford 1984), 401–33.
- Rhetoric at Paris and Oxford in the mid-thirteenth century. (University of California Press for the International Society for the history of Rhetoric, 1983)
- (ed.), The Rise of British Logic: Acts of the Sixth European Symposium on Medieval Logic and Semantics, Papers in Mediaeval Studies 7, Pontifical Institute of Mediaeval Studies, Toronto, 1985.
- The Liber sex principiorum, a supposedly Porretanean work (Bibliopolis, 1985)
- (ed.), Robert Kilwardby, On Time and Imagination. Oxford: Oxford University Press, 1987.
