= Adriane Rini =

American academic and professor

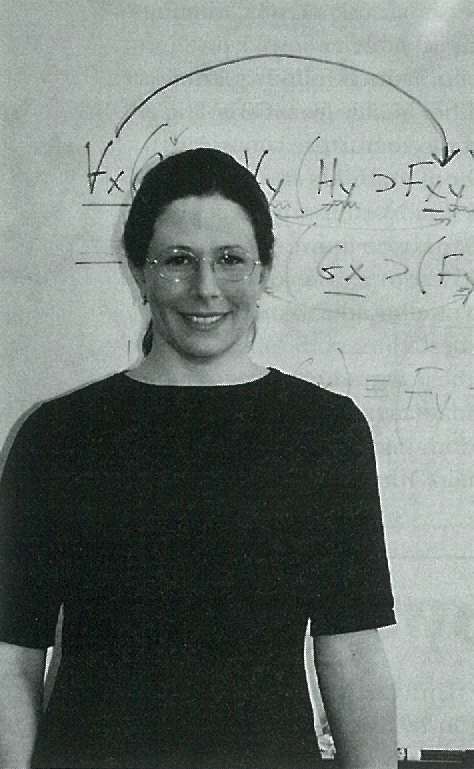
- Rini in 2002
- Occupation: Philosopher

Academic background
- Education: University of Massachusetts Amherst
- Thesis: Modal Propositions in Aristotle's Syllogistic (1997)
- Doctoral advisor: Gareth Matthews

Academic work
- Institutions: Massey University

Adriane Allison Rini is an American academic and professor of philosophy at Massey University in New Zealand. Her research interests include Aristotelian logic, modal logic, and the history of logic. She was married to the logician Max Cresswell.

== Academic career ==
Rini earned a bachelor's degree at Smith College. She graduated with a PhD on modal logic from the University of Massachusetts Amherst in 1997, with the thesis Modal Propositions in Aristotle's Syllogistic supervised by Gareth Matthews.

She moved to New Zealand in 1993 to Victoria University of Wellington, and in 1999 took a lecturing position at Massey University. She was promoted to full professor in 2018, with effect from 1 January 2019.

Rini has received four Marsden grants, including a grant to study the significance of the work of New Zealand philosopher Arthur Prior, who invented tense (or temporal) logic, and has been described as "laying the path to AI". In 2010 she was awarded a Foreign Fellowship at the Royal Flemish Academy of Belgium for Science and the Arts, to study the development of Quine's attitude to modal logic.

== Selected works ==
=== Books ===
- Rini, Adriane (2011). Aristotle's Modal Proofs: Prior Analytics A8-22 in predicate logic. Dordrecht: Springer. ISBN 978-94-007-0050-5. OCLC 700200168.
- Cresswell, M. J.; Rini, Adriane (2012). The World-Time Parallel: Tense and modality in logic and metaphysics. Cambridge: Cambridge University Press. ISBN 978-1-139-22489-5. OCLC 776694818.

=== Edited volume ===
- Cresswell, Max; Mares, Edwin; Rini, Adriane, eds. (2016). Logical Modalities From Aristotle to Carnap: The Story of Necessity. Cambridge University Press. ISBN 9781107077881.

=== Articles ===
- Rini, Adriane (2000). "Hupo in the Prior Analytics: a note on Disamis XLL". History and Philosophy of Logic. 21 (4): 259–264. doi:10.1080/01445340010013680. Zbl 1002.03504. Wikidata Q58356939.
- Rini, Adriane (November 2016). "The logic of Logic and the Basis of Ethics". Synthese. 193 (11): 3449–3457. doi:10.1007/s11229-015-0946-3. ISSN 0039-7857. S2CID 30244524.
- Rini, Adriane (3 July 2017). "Lloyd and the Logicians: The Analogies in our Reasoning". Australasian Philosophical Review. 1 (3): 259–268. doi:10.1080/24740500.2017.1379874. ISSN 2474-0500. S2CID 171755123.
