= Michel de Certeau =

French Jesuit priest and scholar (1925–1986)

The Reverend Michel de Certeau SJ
- Born: Michel Jean Emmanuel de La Barge de Certeau; 17 May 1925; Chambéry, Savoie, France
- Died: 9 January 1986 (aged 60); Paris, France

Academic background
- Education: Collège de France; University of Grenoble (B.A., 1950); Séminaire provincial de Lyon Saint-Irénée (Licentiate, 1950); École pratique des hautes études; Sorbonne (Ph.D., 1960)
- Doctoral advisor: Jean Orcibal

Academic work
- Institutions: University of Paris 8 (1968–1971); University of Paris 7 (1971–1977); University of Geneva (1977–1978); University of California, San Diego (1978–1984); EHESS (1984–1986)
- Main interests: History of religion; Psychoanalysis; Philosophy; Sociology
- Notable works: The Practice of Everyday Life (1980)

Michel Jean Emmanuel de La Barge de Certeau (French: [sɛʁto]; 17 May 1925 – 9 January 1986) was a French Jesuit Catholic priest and scholar whose work combined history, psychoanalysis, philosophy, and the social sciences as well as hermeneutics, semiotics, ethnology, and religion. He was known as a philosopher of everyday life and was widely regarded as a historian with interests ranging from travelogues of the sixteenth and seventeenth centuries in The Mystic Fable (1982) to contemporary urban life in The Practice of Everyday Life (1980).

He participated in major French intellectual movements including ressourcement theology, Lacanian psychoanalysis, Greimasian semiotics, and nouvelle histoire. He first came to public prominence with contemporary articles on the French May 68 protests that were collected in The Capture of Speech (1968).

== Early life and education ==
Michel Jean Emmanuel de La Barge de Certeau was born on 17 May 1925 in Chambéry, Savoie to a provincial aristocratic family. De Certeau's education was eclectic, following the medieval tradition of peregrinatio academica.

From fall 1944 to spring 1950, he pursued a bachelor's degree in classics and philosophy at the University of Grenoble, having also attended courses in Paris at the Collège de France. In Paris, he attended the last seminars of the historian of religion and French philosophy Jean Baruzi at the Collège de France, and in Lyon he encountered ressourcement theologian Henri de Lubac. He was attracted to Carthusian practice but instead undertook religious training at the Séminaire provincial de Lyon Saint-Irénée, where he entered the Jesuit order (Society of Jesus) in 1950, took his vows in 1953, and was ordained in 1956.

In the year of his ordination, de Certeau became one of the founding editors of the Jesuit spiritual journal Christus, with which he would actively be involved for much of his life. After ordination, he studied the works of the co-founder of the Jesuits Pierre Favre (1506–1546) at the École pratique des hautes études (Paris) with Jean Orcibal. In 1960 he earned his doctorate ("thèse de 3e Cycle") at the Sorbonne with this study.

== Career ==
After earning his doctorate, de Certeau studied Jean-Joseph Surin, the exorcist of the Loudun possessions. He edited Surin's Guide spirituel pour la perfection (1963) and his Correspondance (1966) for the Jesuit order, then produced one of his first major historical works, La possession de Loudun (1970). At the same time, de Certeau became involved in the Catholic Church in Latin America, first visiting South America in 1966 after an invitation to Rio de Janeiro, Brazil. There he became associated with supporters of the liberation theology movement, writing on Che Guevara, Ivan Illich, and Hélder Câmara. De Certeau's work on Catholic religion next focused on its transition "from early modern orality and mysticism to modern practices of writing and religion which he termed the ‘scriptural economy’" in Le christianisme eclaté (1974, with Jean-Marie Domenach), in L'Écriture de l'histoire (1975), and in La fable mystique (Vol. 1: 1982, Vol. 2: posthumous, 2013).

De Certeau was greatly influenced by Sigmund Freud and psychoanalysis. In 1963 he became one of the sixty founding members of Jacques Lacan's École Freudienne de Paris, an informal group which served as a focal point for French scholars interested in psychoanalysis. In the early 1960s he was also strongly influenced by Jesuit philosopher Pierre Teilhard de Chardin, and he published some of de Chardin's letters and texts. He was also a regular attendee of the semiotics seminars chaired by Algirdas Julien Greimas.

De Certeau came to wider public attention in France after publishing articles dealing with the May 1968 events in France. The first were collected in La prise de parole, pour une nouvelle culture (1968) and later translated into English as The Capture of Speech in 1998; they are named for his widely repeated claim that the May 68 protestors had "captured speech" like the early French Revolutionaries had captured the Bastille. This began a long series of articles and collections, including L'Etrangeur, ou l'union dans la différence (1969), L'Absent de l'histoire (1973), La Culture au pluriel (1974) and L'Ecriture de l'histoire (1975), several of which were later translated into English. These established him as a leading theorist of the Nouvelle histoire movement, a branch of the Annales school.

In 1968, after publishing La prise de parole, de Certeau was appointed a professor of psychoanalysis and history at the then-new University of Paris VIII-Vincennes, which had been founded in response to the May 68 protests. In 1971 he became a chair of cultural anthropology at the University of Paris VII. He took part in Robert Jaulin's department of ethnology at the University of Paris VII. However, when he applied for a position at the École des Hautes Études en Sciences Sociales (EHESS) and was turned down in 1977, he served a year as visiting professor at the University of Geneva 1977–1978. Next he moved to the American West Coast, becoming a teacher of literature, anthropology, and history at the University of California, San Diego in 1978, where he remained until returning to France for a full professorship in historical anthropology at the EHESS in 1984; he maintained that position until his death in 1986.

== Major works ==
=== The Practice of Everyday Life ===
De Certeau's most well-known and influential work in the United States has been The Practice of Everyday Life, cited in fields such as rhetoric, performance studies, and law. In The Practice of Everyday Life, de Certeau combined his disparate scholarly interests to develop a theory of the productive and consumptive activity inherent in everyday life. The book was the product of a long term research project running from 1974 to 1978.

According to de Certeau, everyday life is distinctive from other practices of daily existence because it is repetitive and unselfconscious. De Certeau’s study of everyday life is neither the study of “popular culture”, nor is it necessarily the study of everyday resistances to regimes of power. Instead, he attempts to outline the way individuals unselfconsciously navigate everything from city streets to literary texts to futurology. The Practice of Everyday Life distinguishes strategy and tactics. De Certeau links "strategies" with institutions and structures of power who are the "producers", while individuals are "consumers" or "poachers," acting in accordance with, or against, environments defined by strategies by using "tactics". These particular themes of the book became especially influential in English-language reception of de Certeau, most notably through their influence on media scholars John Fiske and Henry Jenkins.

According to Andrew Blauvelt, who relies on the work of de Certeau in his essay on design and everyday life:

De Certeau's investigations into the realm of routine practices, or the "arts of doing" such as walking, talking, reading, dwelling, and cooking, were guided by his belief that despite repressive aspects of modern society, there exists an element of creative resistance to these structures enacted by ordinary people. In The Practice of Everyday Life, de Certeau outlines an important critical distinction between strategies and tactics in this battle of repression and expression. According to him, strategies are used by those within organizational power structures, whether small or large, such as the state or municipality, the corporation or the proprietor, a scientific enterprise or the scientist. Strategies are deployed against some external entity to institute a set of relations for official or proper ends, whether adversaries, competitors, clients, customers, or simply subjects. Tactics, on the other hand, are employed by those who are subjugated. By their very nature tactics are defensive and opportunistic, used in more limited ways and seized momentarily within spaces, both physical and psychological, produced and governed by more powerful strategic relations.

=== The Writing of History ===
De Certeau's work The Writing of History, first published in French as L'Écriture de l'histoire in 1975 and then translated into English and published in 1988 in English after his death, deals with the relationship between history and religion. He links the history of writing history to the legitimization of political power and asserts that "Western" traditions of history involve using the act of writing as a tool of colonialism, writing their own histories while un-writing the embodied traditions of native peoples. The book was written following travel and teaching in Jesuit university networks in Latin America beginning 1967. It has been credited with anticipating the postcolonial theory of Edward Said's Orientalism (1978) and Gayatri Chakravorty Spivak's In Other Worlds (1987).

== Death ==
De Certeau died in Paris on 10 January 1986, aged 60, from pancreatic cancer. On his death, Luce Giard became his literary executor.

== Legacy ==
A multidisciplinarian, de Certeau wrote ground-breaking studies in fields as diverse as mysticism, the act of faith, cultural dynamics in contemporary society, and historiography as an intellectual practice. His impact continues unabated, with new volumes appearing regularly, and perhaps surprisingly his reputation is growing even more rapidly in English and German-speaking countries and the Mediterranean than in his native France. This strong and growing interest in academia is not matched in the public sphere, however, partly due to his being considered a "difficult" author because of his highly personal style which makes translation difficult, and partly due to the declining status of French in the world generally. Nevertheless, portions of his prolific output have been translated into a dozen languages.

Pope Francis, a fellow Jesuit, made reference to his works in the 2024 encyclical letter Dilexit nos. James C. Scott, an American political scientist and anthropologist known for his works on political anarchism and peasant resistance, has expressed debts to de Certeau in interviews and written works. Philosopher Paul Ricoeur was engaged in debate on the philosophy of time with de Certeau at the time of de Certeau's death in 1986, and he drew on that influence in his Time and Narrative (Vol 3, 1985) and later work.

== Bibliography ==
In French

- La prise de parole, pour une nouvelle culture. Desclée de Brouwer. 1968
- La Possession de Loudun. Gallimard. 1970.
- La Culture au Pluriel. Union Générale d'Editions, 1974.
- L'Ecriture de l'Histoire. Editions Gallimard. 1975.
- With Dominique Julia and Jacques Revel. Une Politique de la Langue : La Révolution Française et les Patois, l'enquête de Grégoire. Gallimard. 1975.
- L'Invention du Quotidien. Vol. 1, Arts de Faire. Union générale d'éditions 10-18. 1980.
- La Fable Mystique. vol. 1, XVIe-XVIIe Siècle. Editions Gallimard. 1982.
- Histoire et psychanalyse entre science et fiction. Editions Gallimard. 1987. (Rev.ed. 2002)
- La Faiblesse de Croire. Edited by Luce Giard. Seuil. 1987.

In English

- The Practice of Everyday Life. Translated by Steven Rendall. University of California Press. 1984. ISBN 978-0-520-27145-6
- Heterologies: Discourse on the Other. Translated by Brian Massumi. University of Minnesota Press. 1986. ISBN 0-8166-1403-2
- The Writing of History. Translated by Tom Conley. Columbia University Press. 1988. ISBN 978-0-231-05575-8
- The Mystic Fable, Volume One: The Sixteenth and Seventeenth Centuries. Translated by Michael B. Smith. University of Chicago Press. 1995. ISBN 9780226100371.
- With Luce Giard and Pierre Mayol. The Practice of Everyday Life. Vol. 2, Living and Cooking. Translated by Timothy J. Tomasik. University of Minnesota Press. 1998. ISBN 978-0-8166-2877-3
- The Capture of Speech and Other Political Writings. Translated by Tom Conley. University of Minnesota Press. 1997. ISBN 978-0-8166-2768-4
- Culture in the Plural. Translated by Tom Conley. University of Minnesota Press. 1997. ISBN 978-0-8166-2767-7
- The Certeau Reader. Edited by Graham Ward. Blackwell Publishers. 1999. ISBN 978-0-63121278-2
- The Possession at Loudun. Translated by Michael B. Smith. University of Chicago Press. 2000. ISBN 9780226100357.
- The Mystic Fable, Volume Two: The Sixteenth and Seventeenth Centuries. Translated by Michael B. Smith. University of Chicago Press. 2015. ISBN 9780226209135.

== See also ==
- Spatial turn

== Sources ==
- Blomfield, Jocelyn Dunphy (July 1999). "Clio's redress: renewing the new history". Paragraph. 22 (2): 164–183. JSTOR 43263361.
- Burke, Peter (December 2002). "The Art of Re-Interpretation: Michel de Certeau". Theoria: A Journal of Social and Political Theory (100): 27–37. JSTOR 41802683.
- Caves, Roger W. (2005). "Michel de Certeau". Encyclopedia of the City. Routledge. pp. 166–167. ISBN 978-0-41586287-5.
- de Certeau, Michel (1984). The Practice of Everyday Life. Translated by Rendall, Stephen F. University of California Press. ISBN 978-0-520-27145-6. OCLC 10122084.
- de Certeau, Michel (1988). The Writing of History. Translated by Conley, Tom. Columbia University Press. ISBN 978-0-231-05575-8.
- de Certeau, Michel; Giard, Luce; Mayol, Pierre (1998). The Practice of Everyday Life, Volume 2: Living and Cooking. Translated by Tomasik, Timothy J. University of Minnesota Press. ISBN 978-0-816-62877-3.
- Frijhoff, Willem (2010). "6. Michel de Certeau (1925–1986)". In Daileader, Philip; Whalen, Philip (eds.). French Historians 1900-2000: New Historical Writing in Twentieth-Century France. John Wiley & Sons. pp. 76–92. ISBN 978-1-4443-2366-5. OCLC 1039171649.
- Gabon, Alain (2008). "Reviewed Work: Michel de Certeau: Analysing Culture by Ben Highmore". SubStance. 37 (1, 115): 164–174. JSTOR 25195163.
- Johansson, Anna; Vinthagen, Stellan (2020). Conceptualizing 'Everyday Resistance' (ebook ed.). Routledge. ISBN 978-1-315-15015-4.
- Napolitano, Valentina; Pratten, David (21 May 2007). "Michel de Certeau: Ethnography and the challenge of plurality". Social Anthropology. 15 (1): 1–12. doi:10.1111/j.1469-8676.2007.00005.x.
- Vinthagen, Stellan; Scott, James C. (17 December 2017). "The Journal of Resistance Studies' Interview with James C Scott" (PDF). Journal of Resistance Studies. 6 (1): 136–156.
- Weymans, Wim (May 2004). "Michel de Certeau and the Limits of Historical Representation". History and Theory. 43 (2): 161–178. JSTOR 3590702.
