= Stellan Vinthagen =

Swedish activist and sociologist (born 1964)

- Born: October 13, 1964 (age 61)

Academic background
- Education: University of Gothenburg

Stellan Vinthagen (born October 13, 1964) is a professor of sociology, a scholar-activist, and the Inaugural Endowed Chair in the Study of Nonviolent Direct Action and Civil Resistance at the University of Massachusetts Amherst, where he directs the Resistance Studies Initiative. He is also Co-Leader of the Resistance Studies Group at University of Gothenburg and co-founder of the Resistance Studies Network, as well as Editor of the Journal of Resistance Studies, a Council Member of War Resisters' International, and academic advisor to the International Center on Nonviolent Conflict.

His research has focused on resistance, power, social movements, nonviolent action, conflict transformation and social change. Since 1980, he has been an educator, organizer and activist in several countries; he has participated in more than 30 nonviolent civil disobedience actions, for which he has served in total more than one year in prison.

== Biography ==
Vinthagen holds a PhD (2005) in Peace and Development Research from the University of Gothenburg. His dissertation reinterpreted and gave a secular conceptualisation for the religious framing of nonviolent action by the strategist of the Indian anti-colonial movement, Mohandas K. Gandhi, with the help of modern social science. Vinthagen has written or edited more than eight books and numerous articles, including: Conceptualizing 'Everyday Resistance' (2017, Routledge, with Anna Johansson); Nonviolent Resistance and Culture, (2012, Peace & Change journal, with Majken Sørensen), and Tackling Trident (2012, Irene Publishing, with Justin Kenrick and Kelvin Mason).

Vinthagen has been active in many different social movements since 1980 (environmental, migrant rights, anti-arms trade, peace, Palestine solidarity, animal rights, etc.). He has been an educator, organizer and activist in several countries, and has participated in more than 30 nonviolent civil disobedience actions.

He was between 1986 and 2000 one of the key organizers of the European Plowshares Movement, a movement that carries out nonviolent direct disarmament actions at military bases or arms factories. 1986 he took part in a disarmament action, Pershing to Plowshares, in which he together with three others used hammers and bolt-cutters to destroy a Pershing II launcher at the US nuclear base Mutlangen, in former West Germany. 1998 he again acted in a group, Bread Not Bombs, that tried to use hammers to 'disarm' a nuclear Trident submarine at a shipyard in the UK. Since 2000 he has been an active participant in the global justice movement and the World Social Forum, and since 2010 a member of the Council of War Resisters’ International (WRI).

He was one of the initiators of the Academic Conference Blockades 2007 at the Trident nuclear submarine base in Faslane, Scotland as part of the 'Faslane 365' civil disobedience campaign (see Faslane Peace Camp). During two blockades more than 50 academics from different countries and very different scientific disciplines, blockaded the entrance of the nuclear base, while conducting a normal academic conference, reading out their research papers, and discussing with students. Both conferences ended with police arrests.

Vinthagen is also one of the initiators of the Swedish Ship to Gaza, a coalition member of the 2010 Gaza Freedom Flotilla, which in May 2010 tried to break the siege of Gaza with several ships bringing hundreds of humanitarian workers and aid to the humanitarian crisis in Gaza. When the Israeli military killed nine of the participants and wounded more than 30 others, the action became world news for a long time after. Vinthagen was the coordinator of nonviolent action trainings for the Gaza Freedom Flotilla in 2011 and 2012. 2011 he was on the boat Juliano and blocked by the Greek Coast Guard, and in 2012, he was, together with others on board the ship Estelle while sailing on international water outside of Gaza, shot repeatedly by an electric gun and arrested by the Israeli navy. Since then he is deported and banned from Israel for ten years. The Freedom Flotilla was described by the UN special rapporteur Richard A. Falk as the single most important liberation action since the start of the occupation of Palestine. According to the Hamas West Bank lawmaker Aziz Dweik, “the Gaza flotilla has done more for Gaza than 10,000 rockets.”

Vinthagen published a blog on resistance studies at the University of Massachusetts Amherst through April 2017.

== Selected publications ==
Peer-reviewed articles:

- with Anna Johansson (2015) “Dimensions of Everyday Resistance: The Case of Palestinian Sumûd”, Journal of Political Power, published online on Feb 20. doi:10.1080/2158379X.2015.1010803.
- with Lilja, Mona (2014) “Sovereign Power, Disciplinary Power and Biopower: Resisting What Power With What Resistance?”, Journal of Political Power, 7(1).
- with Anna Johansson (2014) “Dimensions of Everyday Resistance: An Analytical Framework”, Critical Sociology.
- with Lilja, Mona, and Mikael Baaz (2013) “Exploring ‘irrational’ resistance”, Journal of Political Power.
- (2013) “Legal Mobilization and Resistance Movements as Social Constituents of International Law”, Finnish Yearbook of International Law, 21.
- with Håkan Gustafsson (2013) “Law on the Move - Reflections on Legal Change and Social Movements”, Retfærd: Nordisk Juridisk Tidskrift.
- with Anna Johansson (2013) “‘Everyday Resistance’: Exploration of a Concept & its Theories”, Resistance Studies Magazine.
- with Majken Jul Sørensen (2012) “Nonviolent Resistance and Culture”, Peace & Change.
- (2011) “Framväxten av sociala rörelsers globala politik”, Sociologisk Forskning.
- with Håkan Gustafsson (2010): “Rättens rörelser och rörelsernas rätt”, Tidsskrift for Rettsvitenskap, vol. 123, 4 & 5/2010, pp. 637–693. ISSN 0040-7143.
- with Sharon Erickson Nepstad (2008) “Strategic Changes and Cultural Adaptations: Explaining Differential Outcomes in the International Plowshares Movement”, University of Southern Maine, International Journal of Peace Studies, IPRA, Vol. 13, No. 1, Spring/summer, pp. 15–42.
- (2008) “Is the World Social Forum a Democratic Global Civil Society?”, Societies without Borders, (v.3, #1), Brill; and in Blau, Judith and Marina Karides, The World and US Social Forums: A Better World Is Possible and Necessary, Brill, Chapter 8, pp. 131–148.
- (2008) “Political Undergrounds: Raging Riots and Everyday Theft as Politics of Normality?”, online publication with referee process, Museion, University of Gothenburg and Museum of World Culture, Gothenburg, (26 pages).
- (2008) “Bortom civilisationens kontroll” [Beyond the Control of Civilization], Glänta, 4:07, Gothenburg, p. 72-78.
- with Sean Chabot (2007) “Rethinking Nonviolent Action and Contentious Politics: Political Cultures of Nonviolent Opposition in the Indian Independence Movement and Brazil’s Landless Workers Movement”, Research in Social Movements, Conflicts and Change, Elsevier Sciences/JAI Press, Oxford, Vol. 27, pp. 91–122.
- (2006) “Power as Subordination and Resistance as Disobedience: Nonviolent Movements and the Management of Power”, Asian Journal of Social Science, 34:1, pp. 1–21.

Monographs:

- with Anna Johansson (2017) Conceptualizing 'Everyday Resistance': A Transdisciplinary Approach. New York: Routledge.
- (2015) A Theory of Nonviolent Action: How Civil Resistance Works. London: ZED Books.
- with Håkan Gustafsson and Patrik Oskarsson (2013) Law, Resistance and Transformation: Social Movements and Legal Strategies in the Indian Narmada Struggle, Lund Studies in the Sociology of Law 43. Lund: Department of Sociology of Law, Lund University.
- with Justin Kenrick and Kelvin Mason (eds.) (2012) Tackling Trident: Academics in Action through Academic Conference Blockades. Irene Publishing: Ed (360 pages).
- with Pelle Strindlund (2011) Motståndets väg: civil olydnad som teori och praktik (The Way of Resistance: Civil Disobedience as Theory and Practice) Stockholm: Karneval.
- with Mona Lilja (eds.) 2009 Motstånd [Resistance], Liber Förlag: Stockholm (347 pages).
- (2005) Ickevåldsaktion – En social praktik av motstånd och konstruktion [Nonviolent Action – A Social Practice of Resistance and Construction], PhD Dissertation, Department of Peace and Development Research (Padrigu), University of Gothenburg, Sweden (ISBN 918738065X). (486 pages).
- (1998) Förberedelse för Motstånd – En kritik av plogbillsrörelsens förberedelsemetoder och inre konflikthantering, [Preparation for Resistance – A Critique of the Preparation Methods and Internal Conflict Management of the Plowshares Movement], published by Omega Förlag and Stiftelsen för Fredsarbete, Göteborg (107 pages).

== See also ==
- List of peace activists
- Plowshares Movement
- Resistance Studies Magazine
