= Miriam Meyerhoff =

New Zealand sociolinguist (born 1964)

Miriam Meyerhoff FBA
- Born: 1964 (age 61–62)
- Relatives: Mary Cresswell (mother); Hans Meyerhoff (father); Max Cresswell (step-father)

Academic background
- Education: University of Pennsylvania
- Thesis: 'Be i no Gat' : constraints on null subjects in Bislama (1997)
- Doctoral advisor: Gillian Sankoff

Academic work
- Discipline: Sociolinguistics
- Institutions: University of Hawaii at Manoa; University of Edinburgh; University of Auckland; Victoria University of Wellington; All Souls College, Oxford
- Website: All Souls College profile

Miriam Meyerhoff, FBA (born 1964) is a New Zealand sociolinguist and academic. In 2020, she was appointed a senior research fellow at All Souls College, Oxford. In 2024 she was elected a Fellow of the British Academy.

== Early life and family ==
Meyerhoff was born in 1964, the daughter of poet Mary Cresswell and philosopher Hans Meyerhoff. Her father died in a car accident the following year, and her mother married logician Max Cresswell in 1970. The family subsequently moved to New Zealand.

== Academic career ==
Meyerhoff completed a Master of Arts degree at Victoria University of Wellington, and, in 1997, a PhD at the University of Pennsylvania. Her PhD supervisor was Gillian Sankoff.

Meyerhoff has held faculty positions at the University of Hawaii at Manoa, the University of Edinburgh, the University of Auckland, and Victoria University of Wellington. In 2020, Meyerhoff was appointed a senior research fellow at All Souls College, University of Oxford.

Meyerhoff's research examines the sociolinguistic constraints on variation, principally in communities characterised by language or dialect contact. Much of her work since her dissertation has been on Creoles, as their (typical) lack of standardisation leads to variation and change at all levels of linguistic structure.

She is the author of a well-regarded introductory textbook on sociolinguistics (Meyerhoff 2018).

Meyerhoff has spoken to media on linguistic issues, including: whether New Zealand speech is affected by migration patterns and diversity; the use of the word eh in New Zealand English; and the impact of digital technology on communication.

== Honours ==
In 2017, Meyerhoff was elected an honorary fellow of the Royal Society Te Apārangi. In 2020, was inducted as a Fellow of the Linguistic Society of America. In 2024, she was elected a Fellow of the British Academy (FBA), the United Kingdom's national academy for the humanities and social sciences.

== Publications ==
- Holmes, Janet; Meyerhoff, Miriam (2003). The Handbook of Language and Gender. Malden, MA: Blackwell. According to WorldCat, the book is held in 811 libraries.
- Meyerhoff, Miriam (2006). Introducing Sociolinguistics. London: Routledge. According to WorldCat, the book is held in 511 libraries in 40 editions.
- Meyerhoff, Miriam; Nagy, Naomi (2008). Social Lives in Language—Sociolinguistics and Multilingual Speech Communities Celebrating the Work of Gillian Sankoff. Amsterdam: John Benjamins.
- Meyerhoff, Miriam; Schleef, Erik (2010). The Routledge Sociolinguistics Reader. London: Routledge.
- Ehrlich, Susan; Meyerhoff, Miriam; Holmes, Janet (2014). The Handbook of Language, Gender, and Sexuality. Wiley Blackwell.
- Meyerhoff, Miriam; Schleef, Erik; Mackenzie, Laurel (2015). Doing Sociolinguistics: A practical guide. London: Routledge/Taylor & Francis.
- Meyerhoff, Miriam. 2018. Introducing Sociolinguistics. Routledge. ISBN 9781138185593
- Hazenberg, Evan; Meyerhoff, Miriam (2017). Representing Trans: Linguistic, legal and everyday perspectives. Wellington: Victoria University Press.
- Ansaldo, Umberto; Meyerhoff, Miriam (2021). The Routledge Handbook of Pidgin and Creole Languages. London: Routledge.
