= The Fold: Leibniz and the Baroque =

1988 book by Gilles Deleuze

- Author: Gilles Deleuze
- Translator: Tom Conley
- Language: French
- Subject: Leibniz's philosophy
- Publisher: Editions de Minuit
- Publication date: 1988
- Media type: Print
- Pages: 191 pp.
- ISBN: 9782707311825

The Fold: Leibniz and the Baroque (French: Le Pli: Leibnitz et le Baroque) is a book by Gilles Deleuze which offers a new interpretation of the Baroque and of the work of Leibniz. Deleuze argues that Leibniz's work constitutes the grounding elements of Baroque philosophy of art and science. Deleuze views Leibniz's concept of the monad as folds of space, movement and time. He also interprets the world as a body of infinite folds that weave through compressed time and space.

== Influence ==
The Fold started to influence architectural design and theory shortly after it was published in 1988. Greg Lynn's guest-edited 1993 March-April issue of Architectural Design, which is titled Folding in Architecture, was one of the first publications that associated Deleuze's writing on the Baroque with contemporary architecture.
