= Jean Orcibal =

French historian

- Born: 10 May 1913; Bordeaux, France
- Died: 18 December 1991 (aged 78); Bordeaux, France
- Occupation: Historian

Academic background
- Education: École normale supérieure École pratique des hautes études
- Academic advisor: Alexandre Koyré

Academic work
- Institutions: French National Centre for Scientific Research; École pratique des hautes études
- Doctoral students: Michel de Certeau

Jean Orcibal (10 May 1913 – 18 December 1991) was a French historian.

A member of the École française de Rome between 1933 and 1939, from 1952 he was directeur d'études at the École pratique des hautes études in his specialty, the history of modern and contemporary Catholicism. He particularly focused his research on Fénelon by editing his voluminous correspondence and on Jansenism. In 1990, he won the Amic Prize awarded by the Académie Française.

== Works ==
- 1937: La formation spirituelle d'Angelus Silesius (Johann Scheffler), thesis,
- 1944: Jean Duvergier de Hauranne, abbé de Saint-Cyran et son temps, doctorate thesis,
- 1949: Louis XIV contre Innocent IX,
- 1951: Louis XIV et les protestants,
- 1957: Port-Royal entre le miracle et l'obéissance,
- 1959: La rencontre du Carmel Thérésien avec les mystiques du nord,
- 1961: Saint-Cyran et le jansénisme,
- 1962: La spiritualité de Saint-Cyran,
- 1965: Le cardinal de Bérulle. Évolution d'une spiritualité,
- 1966: Saint-Jean de la Croix et les mystiques rhéno-flamands,
- 1982: Benoît de Canfield. La règle de perfection,
- 1989: Jansénius d'Ypres.
