= Lyell Cresswell =

New Zealand composer (1944–2022)

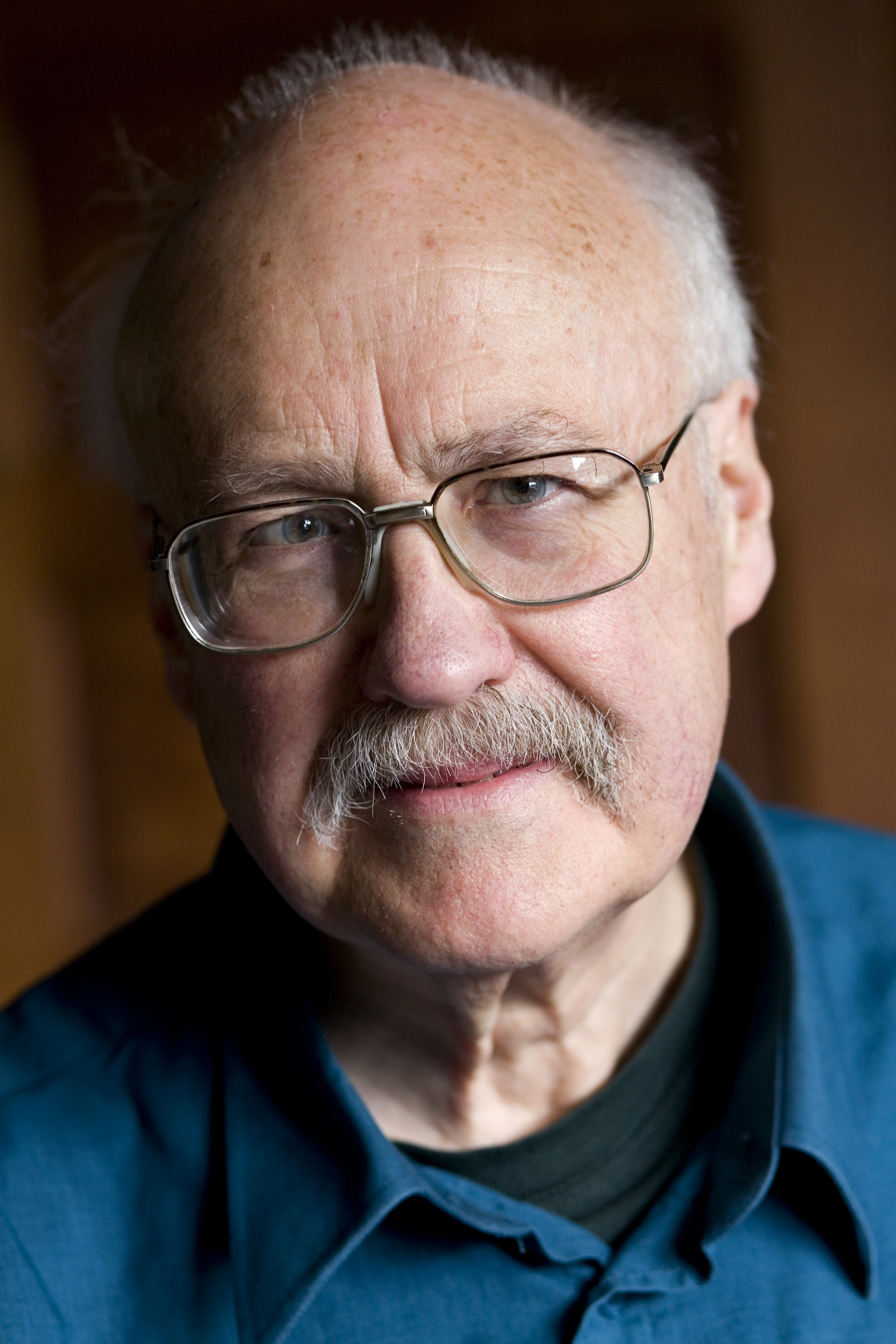
- Cresswell in 2011

Background information
- Born: Lyell Richard Cresswell; 13 October 1944; Wellington, New Zealand
- Died: 19 March 2022 (aged 77) Edinburgh, Scotland
- Relatives: Max Cresswell (brother)

Lyell Richard Cresswell (13 October 1944 – 19 March 2022) was a New Zealand composer of contemporary classical music. He was the younger brother of philosopher Max Cresswell. Cresswell studied in Wellington, Toronto, Aberdeen and Utrecht and lived and worked in Edinburgh from 1985 on. Although he lived more than half his life away from New Zealand, he regarded himself as a New Zealander.

Cresswell died from liver cancer, complicated by COVID-19.

== Early life and education ==
Cresswell was born in Wellington in 1944, the younger brother of Max Cresswell; his family belonged to the Salvation Army. He played the trumpet, euphonium and tuba. He studied at Victoria University under David Farquhar, Douglas Lilburn and Frederick Page, gaining a first-class honours degree in composition. In 1969 he went to Toronto to study for a masters degree and three years later in 1972 to Aberdeen to study for a PhD.

== Work ==
Cresswell taught and composed at Glasgow University and worked in arts administration in Cardiff but from 1985 he lived and worked in Edinburgh as a freelance composer, taking commissions for works.

Cresswell wrote music for orchestra, chamber ensembles, choir, voice and solo instruments. His works include several concertos. In 1983 he was commissioned to write a work for the 100th anniversary of the Salvation Army in New Zealand; O! for Orchestra was premiered by the New Zealand Symphony Orchestra. His concerto for accordion, Dragspil (Icelandic for "accordion"), was commissioned for the BBC Proms and premièred by James Crabb and the BBC Scottish Symphony Orchestra at the Royal Albert Hall as part of the 1995 season.

In 2001, the Scottish Arts Council granted him the Creative Scotland Award and commissioned a work, in collaboration with the Scottish Chamber Orchestra, exploring the issues of exile and identity. His composition Shadows Without Sun combines elements of oratorio, opera, music theatre and cantata. It requires orchestra, singers, speaking voices and recorded voices. The work intertwines the story of exiles living in both Scotland and New Zealand with the story of Cassandra. The Money Man, 2010, was written in collaboration with librettist Ron Butlin with whom Cresswell regularly worked.

Cresswell found inspiration from visual arts and literature. Links between painting and music were explored in the piano work The Art of Black and White. In 2013 he collaborated with writer Fiona Farrell to write the song cycle The Clock Stops; performed by the New Zealand Symphony Orchestra it was inspired by the Christchurch earthquakes in 2010 and 2011.

Cresswell's music is recorded on the Naxos Records label.

He died in Edinburgh on 19 March 2022, from liver cancer complicated by a COVID-19 infection. He was 77.

== Awards ==
- Ian Whyte Award (1978) – for the orchestral work Salm
- APRA Silver Scroll (1979) – for his contribution to New Zealand music
- Recommendation by the UNESCO International Rostrum of Composers (1979, 1981 and 1988)
- Scottish Arts Council Creative Scotland Award (2001)
- Honorary DMus degree from the Victoria University of Wellington (2002)
- The inaugural Royal Philharmonic Society Elgar Bursary (2002)
- Creative New Zealand/School of Music Composer in Residence in Wellington (2006–2007)
- SOUNZ Contemporary Award (2011) – for his first piano concerto dedicated to Edward Harper
- Arts Foundation of New Zealand Laureate Award (2016)

== List of compositions ==
=== Concertos ===
- Concerto for cello (commissioned for Musica Nova, Glasgow, 1984)
- Concerto for accordion, Dragspil (BBC Proms, 1995)
- Concerto for orchestra and string quartet (commissioned by the City of Aberdeen, 1996)
- Concerto for trombone, Kaea (Scottish Chamber Orchestra, 1997)
- Concerto for violin and soprano (commissioned by the BBC, 2001)
- Concerto for chamber orchestra (SCO, 2002)
- Concerto for piano (2009) (dedicated to Scottish composer Edward Harper and commissioned by pianist Steven de Pledge)

=== Other orchestral ===
- Salm (1977)
- O! for Orchestra (1983)
- A Modern Ecstasy (1986)
- Voices of Ocean Winds (Radio New Zealand, 1989)
- Ylur (St Magnus Festival, 1991)
- Ara Kopikopiko (2005) – written with the Elgar Bursary
- I Paesaggi dell’anima (Landscapes of the soul), 2008

=== Chamber ===
- Le Sucre du Printemps, for clarinets

=== Vocal ===
- The Voice Inside, for soprano, violin and orchestra
- The Clock Stops (2013)
- Lines from Bishop Blougram's Apology for male voice, trombone and organ (before 1969)

=== Piano ===
- The Grammar of Solitude
- Two Piano Pieces, written for the Indonesian pianist Ananda Sukarlan

- Who's Afraid of Red, Yellow and Blue (1993) - Acquerello (1997)

- Albumblatt (1994, for Iain and Alison)
- The Art of Black and White (1998)
- Toccata (1998)

=== Stage ===
- Shadows Without Sun (2003)
- The Money Man (2010)

== Autobiography ==
Cresswell's autobiography Divigation, Doodlings and Downright Lies was published posthumously in 2024.
