= Mary Cresswell =

New Zealand ecopoet

- Born: Mary Morris Howard; 1937 (age 88–89); Los Angeles, California, U.S.
- Spouses: Hans Meyerhoff (m. 1963; died 1965) Max Cresswell (m. 1970; div. 1991)
- Children: 2
- Relatives: Miriam Meyerhoff (daughter)
- Writing career
- Genre: Poetry

Mary Morris Cresswell (formerly Meyerhoff, née Howard; born 1937) is a poet and science writer living on the Kāpiti Coast, New Zealand.

== Early life ==
Cresswell was born Mary Morris Howard in 1937 in Los Angeles, California. She grew up in Evanston, Illinois, and Los Angeles. She attended the University of California, Riverside and Stanford University, graduating from the latter with a degree in history and English literature. She was married first to the philosopher Hans Meyerhoff, who died in a car accident in 1965, and then married logician Max Cresswell in Los Angeles on 14 March 1970. She moved to New Zealand in 1970, and has lived in Wellington and Waikanae. Her daughter, Miriam Meyerhoff, is a sociolinguist.

== Career ==
Cresswell worked for many years as a science editor, including ten years as editor of the Journal of the Royal Society of New Zealand, and later as an editor for scientists at the Department of Conservation. Her science background infuses her poetry, which is characterised by frequent references to the natural world, "mov[ing] between people, science and nature" and demonstrating "a strong sense of respect for natural settings and features". For the Royal Society, she compiled the proceedings of the 1981 earthquake conference held in Napier held to commemorate the 1931 Hawke's Bay earthquake: Large earthquakes in New Zealand : anticipation, precaution, reconstruction.

Her poetry is notable for a focus on form, including rhyme. It often explores lesser-known formats such as ghazals, glossas, centos as well as more well-known forms such as the sonnet. She acknowledges the influence of the poets Kay Ryan, Paul Muldoon, and Thom Gunn on her work. In 2000 she came third in the New Zealand Poetry Society's International Poetry Competition for her poem "Observations Made in Passing", and in 2008 was highly commended in an annual poetry competition run by the journal Bravado. Her 2011 collection Trace Fossils was runner-up for the Kathleen Grattan Award. Her poems have been published in New Zealand, Australian, Canadian, American and British literary journals, including Best New Zealand Poems (2005) and Best of Best New Zealand Poems (2011).

== Publications ==
- Millionaire's Shortbread, with Mary-Jane Duffy, Mary Macpherson and Kerry Hines (2003, Otago University Press)
- Nearest and Dearest (2009, Steele Roberts)
- Trace Fossils (2011, Steele Roberts)
- Fish Stories (2015, Canterbury University Press)
- Field Notes (2017, Makaro Press)
- Body Politic (2020, Cuba Press)
