= Abdel Rahman Badawi =

Egyptian academic, philosopher and poet (1917–2002)

- عبدالرحمن بدوي
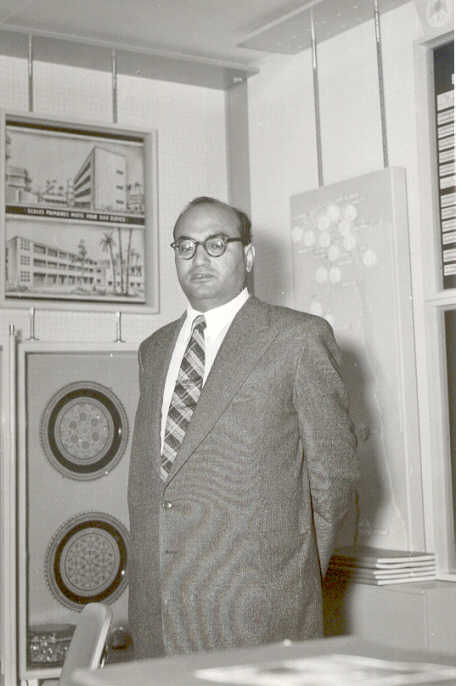
- Born: 17 February 1917; Sharabass, Sultanate of Egypt
- Died: 25 July 2002 (aged 85); Cairo, Egypt

Education
- Education: Cairo University (BA, PhD)
- Academic advisor: Alexandre Koyré

Philosophical work
- Era: Contemporary philosophy
- Region: Western philosophy
- School: Existentialism
- Institutions: Cairo University
- Main interests: History of philosophy
- Notable ideas: Arab existentialism

Abdel Rahman Badawi (Arabic: عبد الرحمن بدوي; February 17, 1917 – July 25, 2002) was an Egyptian existentialist philosopher, professor of philosophy and poet. He has been called the "foremost master of Arab existentialism." He published more than 150 works, mostly rendering of Arabic philosophical manuscripts.

== Life ==
Born to a wealthy family in the village of Sharabass, 95 miles from Cairo, Badawi was educated at al-Saidiya school in Cairo. He graduated with a first-class degree in philosophy from the Egyptian University in 1938, and was supervised for his PhD thesis by Alexandre Koyré.

From 1950 to 1956 he taught at Ain Shams University. As a member of a 1954 committee to draft a new Egyptian constitution, he clashed with Nasser, who dissolved the committee in 1956. From 1956 to 1958 he was a cultural attache in Switzerland, regarding fellow diplomats there as "ignorant and hypocritical".

Badawi described leaving Nasser's Egypt to teach in the Sorbonne in 1967 as escaping "the big jail". However, a professorship in Libya from 1967 to 1973 ended when Muammar Gaddafi visited the university and was embarrassed to be received by Badawi's students arguing for freedom of expression. Gaddafi imprisoned Badawi, publicly burning his personal library. His release was secured after 17 days by Anwar Sadat.

Badawi taught at Kuwait University from 1975 to 1982. He was a contributor to the existentialist magazine Al Adab.
