= Hans Meyerhoff =

American philosopher of German origin (1914–1965)

- Born: 1 December 1914; Braunschweig, Germany
- Died: 20 November 1965 (aged 50); Los Angeles, California, U.S.
- Education: University of California, Los Angeles
- Occupation: Philosopher
- Spouse: Mary Meyerhoff (m. 1963)
- Children: Miriam Meyerhoff

Hans Meyerhoff (1 December 1914 – 20 November 1965) was an American philosopher and professor of philosophy at the University of California, Los Angeles (UCLA). The free speech area in UCLA, Meyerhoff Park, was posthumously named after Meyerhoff.

== Biography ==
Meyerhoff was the son of Theodor Meyerhoff II, owner of the Derenburg canning factory, and Dorothea Meyerhoff (formerly Guttstadt). In 1924, e passed his Abitur examination at the Wilhelm-Gymnasium in Braunschweig.

The Meyerhoff family moved to the United States in 1934, at the age of 19, because of a Nazi edict that limited the number of Jewish students at German universities. He received his B.A. in 1936, M.A. in 1938 and Ph.D. in 1942 from UCLA. During his Ph.D., Meyerhoff was a teaching assistant for Visiting Professor Bertrand Russell.

Immediately after receiving his Ph.D., Meyerhoff joined the federal government, and then the Army of the United States in 1943. He was assigned to the Office of Strategic Services in the Central European section. He served in the Battle of the Bulge and was present at the liberation of the prisoners at Dachau.

Meyerhoff became a professor in the Department of Philosophy at UCLA in 1948. He was also a Visiting Professor at the University of Michigan in 1955-1956, at the Massachusetts Institute of Technology and Brandeis University in 1957-1958, at the Colombia University in 1962, and at the Frederick William University in 1963-1964.

In 1963, he married Mary Howard. Their daughter Miriam was born in 1964. Meyerhoff died on 20 November 1965, as a result of an automobile accident.

== Publications ==
- Time in Literature, University of California Press, 1955
- The Philosophy of History in Our Time, Doubleday, 1959
- Verlorene Spiele. Braunschweig/Los Angeles 1933–1963, Waisenhaus Buchdrickerei Und Verlag Braunschweig, 1963

== Translations ==
Meyerhoff translated works from German to English. Some examples include:

- Man's Place in Nature, written by Max Scheler, 1961
- Plato: An Introduction, written by Paul Friedlander, 1970
