= Ian Prior (doctor) =

New Zealand doctor and epidemiologist

Ian Prior ONZM
- Born: Ian Ambury Miller Prior; 16 October 1923; Masterton, New Zealand
- Died: 17 February 2009 (aged 85); Wellington, New Zealand
- Education: University of Otago
- Occupations: Doctor, epidemiologist
- Spouse: Elespie Forsyth
- Relatives: Arthur Prior (half-brother)

Ian Ambury Miller Prior ONZM (16 October 1923 – 17 February 2009) was a New Zealand doctor, epidemiologist, environmental campaigner and arts patron. He is acknowledged as the founder of epidemiology in New Zealand. He conducted pioneering epidemiological studies of Māori, Cook Islanders and Tokelau Islanders in the 1960s. He was active in a number of environmental campaigns including the International Physicians for the Prevention of Nuclear War, and was well known for his support of the arts, in particular the Wellington Sculpture Trust.

== Early life and education ==
Prior was born in Masterton in 1923, the son of Jessie Anne Prior (née Miller) and Norman Henry Prior (1882–1967), a Masterton general practitioner. His father served as a medical officer in World War I in Egypt, Gallipoli and on the Western Front. Norman and Jessie married in 1920. Prior had an older brother, Arthur Norman Prior (b. 1914), a noted logician and philosopher, from Norman's first marriage to Elizabeth (née Teague); an older sister, Elaine; and a younger brother, Owen, who followed his father into the Masterton general practice.

Prior attended Hadlow Preparatory School in Masterton and Wairarapa High School. He attended the University of Otago Medical School from 1940 to 1945 graduating MB ChB.

== Career ==
Between 1946 and 1949, Prior held positions as a house surgeon at Wellington Hospital, a registrar at New Plymouth Hospital and a pathology registrar in Dunedin. Deciding to specialise in cardiology he went to Britain in 1950 where he was a registrar in Leeds and then in London at the National Heart Hospital. In 1953, he returned to New Zealand to Wellington Hospital where he was a senior registrar and then a physician.

In 1959, he became director of the Medical Unit at Wellington Hospital and then the Epidemiology Unit, which he founded, from 1970 onwards. From 1987 he was an Honorary Fellow in the Department of Community Health (later Public Health) at the Wellington School of Medicine (University of Otago, Wellington).

Prior's career in epidemiology was sparked by a report in 1960 into the incidence of coronary disease, diabetes and hypertension in Māori people and the questions this raised about lifestyle and the wider causes of illness. With assistance from a Ngāi Tūhoe leader, he undertook a study in Whakatāne.

He extended his interest in Māori health to other Pacific peoples, in particular finding out how modernisation and changes in diet contributed to hypertension, diabetes and obesity. His first epidemiological study in the Pacific was in Pukapuka in the northern Cook Islands in 1964 where his team found that diabetes was uncommon and that blood pressure and weight did not increase with age. People ate traditional diets with little flour, sugar and salt and had strong family and social structures.

In 1967, Prior began the Tokelau Island Migrant Study. Atolls in the Tokelaus had been damaged by cyclones and the New Zealand government enabled migration of Tokelau Islanders to New Zealand. Prior's research, which lasted 15 years until 1982, studied those who had migrated and those who stayed in the Tokelaus. It was found that the islanders who remained were healthier; those in New Zealand gained weight, had elevated blood pressure and an increase in rates of asthma, gout and diabetes. However, the migrants who maintained strong cultural ties remained healthier. The study was important for being a multi-disciplinary study of health within the social context of migration. Over the years a number of government, NGO and international organisations assisted the study: the World Health Organisation, the NZ Medical Research Council, the Wellington Hospital Board, the Navy, and the Office of Tokelau Affairs.

In 1973, Prior took part in a study on Ponape Island in the Caroline Islands. The results showed that high scores on an index of modernisation, e.g. schooling and newspaper reading, correlated with high blood pressure.

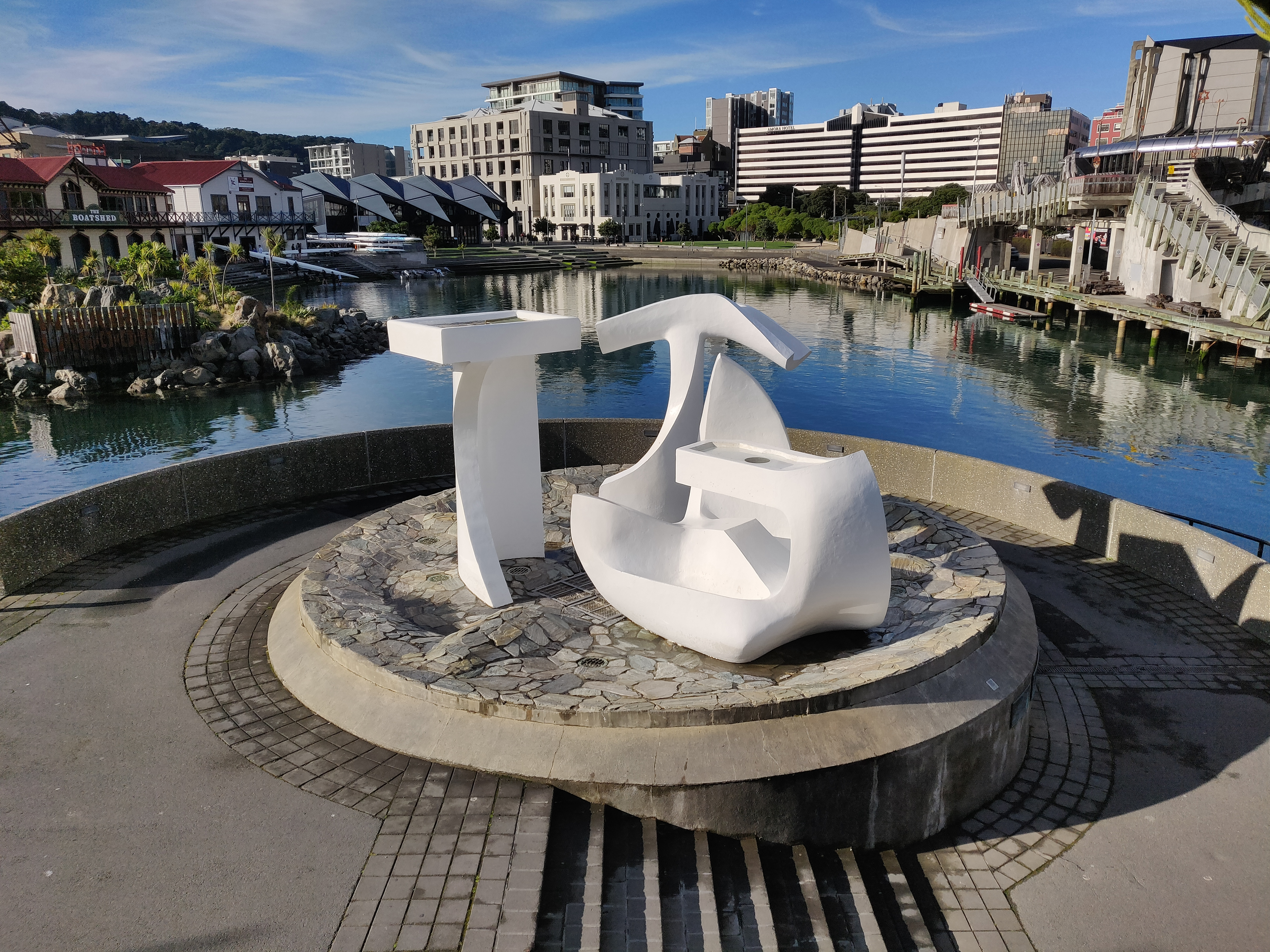
Wellington Sculpture Trust's first commission, Albatross (1986) by Tanya Ashken

== Arts patronage ==
Prior and his brother Owen created, in their father's memory, the Norman Prior Collection at Aratoi, Wairarapa Museum of History and Art in Masterton. Prior and his wife Elespie sponsored many emerging painters, sculptors, musicians and dancers. He was a founder of the Wellington Sculpture Trust in 1982 and its chair from 1997 to 2000.

== Environmental, social and peace campaigns ==
In the 1960s and 1970s, Prior became involved in and chaired the campaign to prevent the raising of Lake Manapouri to provide electricity for an aluminium smelter at Tiwai Point. He protested against 'the dawn raids' which were carried out to arrest and deport illegal Pacific Island 'overstayers' in the 1970s. An opponent of apartheid Prior took part in protests against the 1981 tour by the Springbok rugby team. Prior chaired the Environment and Conservation Organisation (ECO) from 1976 to 1980. In 1982, with other doctors, he formed the New Zealand branch of the International Physicians for the Prevention of Nuclear War (IPPNW). He was the New Zealand chairman from 1994 to 2001 and served on the IPPNW International Council from 1985 to 1990. Prior was on the founding board of, and helped to fund from a family trust, the Pacific Ecologist magazine.

== Honours and awards ==
Prior was appointed an Officer of the New Zealand Order of Merit in the 1996 Queen's Birthday Honours, for services to medicine and the environment. In 1981, he was elected a Fellow of the Royal Society of New Zealand. He was awarded an honorary DSc by Victoria University of Wellington in 1988. The Public Health Association of New Zealand made him a life member in 1990.

== Personal life ==
Prior married Elespie Forsyth (d. 2002) in Dunedin on 14 March 1946. She was the great-granddaughter of early New Zealand businessman Bendix Hallenstein, and her family were supporters of arts and culture and philanthropy. The couple had three daughters. He published two books about their lives and art collection.

== Legacy ==
Prior is recognised as the 'founder of epidemiology' in New Zealand and his influence has been acknowledged in Australia and worldwide. He was able to bring together multi-disciplinary teams, including social scientists, use multi-disciplinary methodologies to address health problems and view the determinants of health as being situated in society and the environment. Sir Michael Marmot has acknowledged Prior's influence in introducing him to epidemiology and public health.

== Selected publications ==
Prior published over 200 articles between 1947 and 2000.

- Prior, Ian. Elespie & Ian: memoir of a marriage, 2006
- Prior, Ian. Two unusual families: the origins of the Prior collection, 2005.
- Howden-Chapman, P; Pene, G; Crane, J; Green, R; Iupati, L; Prior, I; Teao (June 2000). "Tokelau housing in New Zealand". Health Educ Behav. 27 (3): 351–62. doi:10.1177/109019810002700309. PMID 10834808.
- Wessen AF, Hooper A, Huntsman J, Prior I, Salmond CE. Migration and health in a small society: the case of Tokelau. Oxford University Press, 1992.
- Pearce, N; Prior, I; Methven, D; Culling, C; Marshall, S; Auld, J; de Boer, G; Bethwaite, P (1990). "Follow up of New Zealand participants in British atmospheric nuclear weapons tests in the Pacific". BMJ. 300: 1161–6. doi:10.1136/bmj.300.6733.1161. PMC 1662929. PMID 2346802.
- Salmond, CE; Prior, IA; Wessen, AF (July 1989). "Blood pressure patterns and migration: a 14-year cohort study of adult Tokelauans". Am J Epidemiol. 130 (1): 37–52. doi:10.1093/oxfordjournals.aje.a115321. PMID 2787109.
- Prior, IA; Welby, TJ; Ostbye, T; Salmond, CE; Stokes, YM (1987). "Migration and gout: the Tokelau Island migrant study". Br Med J (Clin Res Ed). 295: 457–61. doi:10.1136/bmj.295.6596.457. PMC 1247326. PMID 3117170.
- Salmond, CE; Joseph, JG; Prior, IA; Stanley, DG; Wessen, AF (August 1985). "Longitudinal analysis of the relationship between blood pressure and migration: the Tokelau Island Migrant Study". Am J Epidemiol. 122 (2): 291–301. doi:10.1093/oxfordjournals.aje.a114101. PMID 4014212.
- Patrick, RC; Prior, IA; Smith, JC; Smith, AH (March 1983). "Relationship between blood pressure and modernity among Ponapeans". Int J Epidemiol. 12 (1): 36–44. doi:10.1093/ije/12.1.36. PMID 6601631.
- Prior, IA; Davidson, F; Salmond, CE; Czochanska, Z (August 1981). "Cholesterol, coconuts, and diet on Polynesian atolls: a natural experiment: the Pukapuka and Tokelau island studies". Am J Clin Nutr. 34 (8): 1552–61. doi:10.1093/ajcn/34.8.1552. PMID 7270479.
- Beaglehole, R; Foulkes, MA; Prior, IA; Eyles, EF (1980). "Cholesterol and mortality in New Zealand Maoris". Br Med J. 280: 285–7. doi:10.1136/bmj.280.6210.285. PMC 1600122. PMID 7357343.
- Stanhope, JM; Prior, IA (1975). "Uric acid, joint morbidity, and streptococcal antibodies in Maori and European teenagers. Rotorua Lakes study 3". Ann Rheum Dis. 34: 359–63. doi:10.1136/ard.34.4.359. PMC 1006428. PMID 1190855.
- Prior, IA; Stanhope, JM; Evans, JG; Salmond, CE (September 1974). "The Tokelau Island migrant study". Int J Epidemiol. 3 (3): 225–32. doi:10.1093/ije/3.3.225. PMID 4416612.
- Prior, IA; Evans, JG; Morrison, RB; Rose, BS (September 1970). "The Carterton study. 6. Patterns of vascular, respiratory, rheumatic and related abnormalities in a sample of New Zealand European adults". N Z Med J. 72 (460): 169–77. PMID 5273561.
- Prior, IA; Davidson, F (June 1966). "The epidemiology of diabetes in Polynesians and Europeans in New Zealand and the Pacific". N Z Med J. 65 (406): 375–83. PMID 5222034.
- Neave, M; Prior, IA; Toms, V (1963). "The prevalence of anaemia in two Maori rural communities". N Z Med J. 62: 20–8. PMID 13937838..
- Prior, I (1962). "A health survey in a rural Maori community, with particular emphasis on the cardiovascular, nutritional and metabolic findings". N Z Med J. 61: 333–48. PMID 14488822..
