= Alexandre Koyré =

French philosopher (1892–1964)

- Born: Alexandr Vladimirovich (or Volfovich) Koyra; 29 August 1892; Taganrog, Russia
- Died: 28 April 1964 (aged 71); Paris, France
- Spouse: Dora Reybermann

Education
- Education: University of Göttingen (1908–1911); Collège de France (1912–1913); University of Paris (1912–1913)
- Academic advisors: Henri Bergson; Edmund Husserl

Philosophical work
- Era: 20th-century philosophy
- Region: Western philosophy
- School: Continental philosophy Phenomenology; French historical epistemology
- Institutions: École pratique des hautes études (1922–1962); Fuad University (1933–34, 1936–38, 1940–41); The New School (1941–1945); Johns Hopkins University (1951–1953); Institute for Advanced Study (1955–1962)
- Notable students: Abdel Rahman Badawi; Jean Orcibal
- Main interests: History of science Philosophy of science Historical epistemology
- Notable ideas: Criticism of positivist philosophy of science

Alexandre Koyré (/kwɑːˈreɪ/; French: [kwaʁe]; born Alexandr Vladimirovich (or Volfovich) Koyra; (Note: Russian: Александр Владимирович (Вольфович) Койра, IPA: [ˈkojrə]) 29 August 1892 – 28 April 1964), also anglicized as Alexander Koyre, was a French philosopher of Russian origin who wrote on the history and philosophy of science.

== Life ==
Koyré was born in the city of Taganrog, in the Russian Empire, on 29 August 1892 into a Jewish family. His original name was Alexandr Vladimirovich (or Volfovich) Koyra. In Imperial Russia he studied in Tiflis, Rostov-on-Don and Odessa, before pursuing his studies abroad.

He left Russia in 1905 to study with Henri Bergson in Paris, and in 1908 moved to Göttingen. At the University of Göttingen (1908–1911), he studied under Edmund Husserl and David Hilbert. Husserl did not approve of Koyré's dissertation, whereupon Koyré left for Paris again, to study at the Collège de France and the Sorbonne during the period 1912–1913 under Bergson, Brunschvicg, Lalande, Delbos and Picavet. Following Husserl's Cartesian Meditations, a series of lectures given in Paris in February 1929 (and one of the more important of Husserl's later works), Koyré met again with Husserl repeatedly.

In 1914, he joined the French Foreign Legion as soon as the war broke out. In 1916, he volunteered for a Russian regiment fighting on the Russian front, following a cooperation agreement between the French and Russian governments.

In 1922 Koyré completed his two State doctorate (then called Doctorat ès lettres) theses. The same year he started teaching in Paris at the École pratique des hautes études (EPHE), and became a colleague of Alexandre Kojève, who eventually replaced him as lecturer on Hegel. In 1931, he helped found the philosophical journal Recherches philosophiques. In 1932, the EPHE created a Department of History of Religious Thought in Modern Europe for him to chair. He retained this position until his death.

During the years 1933–34, 1936–38, and 1940–41, Koyré taught in Fuad University (later Cairo University) where, along with André Lalande and others, he introduced the study of modern philosophy to Egyptian academia. His most important student in Cairo was Abdel Rahman Badawi, who is considered the first systematic modern Arab philosopher. Koyré later joined the Egyptian National Committee of the Free French.

During World War II, Koyré lived in New York City, and taught at the New School for Social Research, including a course on Plato's Theaetetus, together with Leo Strauss and Kurt Riezler, in the fall of 1944. After World War II, he was a frequent visitor to the United States, spending half a year at the Institute for Advanced Study at Princeton each year from 1955 to 1962 and also teaching as a visiting professor at Harvard, Yale, the University of Chicago, the University of Wisconsin, and Johns Hopkins. His lectures at Johns Hopkins would form the nucleus of one of his best-known publications, From the Closed World to the Infinite Universe (1957).

He died in Paris on 28 April 1964.

== Work ==
Though best known as a philosopher of science, Koyré started out as a historian of religion. Much of his originality for the period rests on his ability to ground his studies of modern science on the history of religion and metaphysics.

Koyré focused on Galileo, Plato and Isaac Newton. His most famous work is From the Closed World to the Infinite Universe, a series of lectures given at Johns Hopkins University in 1959 on the rise of early modern science and the change of scientists' perception of the world during the period from Nicholas of Cusa and Giordano Bruno through Newton. Though the book has been widely heralded, it was a summation of Koyré's perspective rather than an original new work.

Koyré was suspicious of scientists' claims to prove natural or fundamental truths through experiments. He argued these experiments were based on complicated premises and that they tended to prove the outlook behind these premises, rather than any real truth. He repeatedly critiqued Galileo's experiments, claiming that some of them could not have taken place, and disputed the results Galileo claimed, which modern historians of science had hitherto accepted.

According to Koyré, it was not the experimental or empirical nature of Galileo's and Newton's discoveries that carried the Scientific Revolution of the 16th and 17th centuries, but a shift in perspective, a change in theoretical outlook toward the world. Koyré strongly criticised what he called the "positivist" notion that science should only discover given phenomena, the relations between them, and certain laws that would help to describe or predict them. To Koyré, science was, at its heart, theory: an aspiration to know the truth of the world, of uncovering the essential structures from which phenomena, and the basic laws that relate them, spring.

Koyré was also interested in the correlations between scientific discoveries and religious or philosophical world views. Like Edmund Husserl in his later studies, Koyré claimed that modern science had succeeded in overcoming the split, inherent in traditional Aristotelian science, between Earth and Space, since these were now both seen as governed by the same laws. On the other hand, another split had now been created, between the phenomenal world inhabited by man and the purely abstract, mathematical world of science. Koyré aimed to show how this "first world", the world of human dwelling (personal and historical), apparently irrelevant to modern naturalistic research, was by no means irrelevant for the very constitution and development of this research. Koyré consistently sought to show how scientific truth is always discovered in correlation with specific historical, even purely personal, circumstances.

Koyré's work can be seen as a systematic analysis of the constitutive achievements that resulted in scientific knowledge, but with particular emphasis on the historical, and specifically human, circumstances that generate the scientists' phenomenal world and serve as the foundation for all scientific constitutions of meaning.

Koyré influenced major European and American philosophers of science, most significantly I. Bernard Cohen, Thomas Kuhn, Imre Lakatos, Michel Foucault and Paul Feyerabend.

=== Criticism ===
In the course of his studies of Galileo, Koyré famously claimed that the experiments with weights falling and rolling on inclined planes that Galileo described in his writings probably had not been carried out in practice, but were instead thought experiments intended to illustrate his deductions. Koyré argued that the precision of the results reported by Galileo was not possible with the technology available to him and quoted the contemporary judgement of Marin Mersenne, who had questioned the feasibility of reproducing Galileo's results. Furthermore, according to Koyré, Galileo's science was largely a product of his Platonist philosophy and did not really derive from experimental observations.

Koyré's conclusions were first challenged in 1961 by Thomas B. Settle, who, as a graduate student at Cornell University succeeded in reproducing Galileo's experiments with inclined planes, using the methods and technologies described in Galileo's writings. Later, Stillman Drake and others (e.g., James MacLachlan)—through the replication of other experiments of Galileo's, and the exhaustive working-through of his notes—demonstrated that Galileo had been a careful experimentalist, whose observations likely did play the pivotal role that he had claimed for them in the development of his scientific system. Koyré has been further criticised for his claim about Galileo's Platonism, which he saw as a synonym for mathematics and mathematization of nature; for example, Italian scholar Lodovico Geymonat has argued that consideration of Platonism, as a tradition, does not helpfully illuminate the development of Galileo's mathematical studies, which are mostly concerned with applied mathematics, engineering, and mechanics—i.e., fields that neither Plato, nor subsequent Platonist authors, generally evinced much interest in.

== Honours ==
- General Secretary and Vice President, Institut International de Philosophie
- Member, American Academy of Arts and Sciences
- Sarton Medal, History of Science Society
- CNRS Silver Medal, Centre National de la Recherche Scientifique

== Writings (selection) ==
- La Philosophie de Jacob Boehme, Paris, J. Vrin, 1929.
- Études galiléennes, Paris: Hermann, 1939
- “The Political Function of the Modern Lie” (1945) The Contemporary Jewish Record 8(1) pp. 290–300; reprinted in October vol. 160 (spring 2017), JSTOR 48560510
- Discovering Plato (1946)
- From the Closed World to the Infinite Universe, Baltimore: Johns Hopkins Press, 1957
- La Révolution astronomique: Copernic, Kepler, Borelli, Paris: Hermann, 1961
- The Astronomical Revolution Methuen, London, 1973
- Introduction à la lecture de Platon, Paris: Gallimard, 1994
- Metaphysics & Measurement: Essays in Scientific Revolution, Harvard University Press, 1968
- "A Documentary History of the Problem of Fall from Kepler to Newton" (1955), Transactions of the American Philosophical Society, 45, pp. 329–395
- Newtonian Studies, Chapman & Hall, 1965

== Sources ==
- Jean-François Stoffel, Bibliographie d'Alexandre Koyré, Firenze : L.S. Olschki, 2000.
- Marlon Salomon. "Alexandre Koyré, historiador do pensamento". Goiânia: Almeida & Clément, Brazil, 2010.
