= Resistance Studies Magazine =

Swedish journal

Resistance Studies Magazine (ISSN 1654-7063) was an interdisciplinary, peer-reviewed open access journal devoted to the analysis of contemporary and historical practices of resistance. It was published on a quarterly basis, written in English. The editors behind the magazine were based at the University of Gothenburg, Sweden, and connected to the Resistance Studies Network. The first editor was the PhD student Christopher Kullenberg, the second the independent researcher Jörgen Johansen.

From 2015 this academic publication has been followed by the international, interdisciplinary, peer-reviewed Journal of Resistance Studies, published twice annually, both in paper and online. This journal is only partly open access, and based on subscription fees.

== Sources ==
- Directory of Open Access Journals
- Royal Library of Sweden entry
- Swedish Directory of Journals for Culture and Arts
