= Tom Conley (scholar) =

American academic

Tom Clark Conley
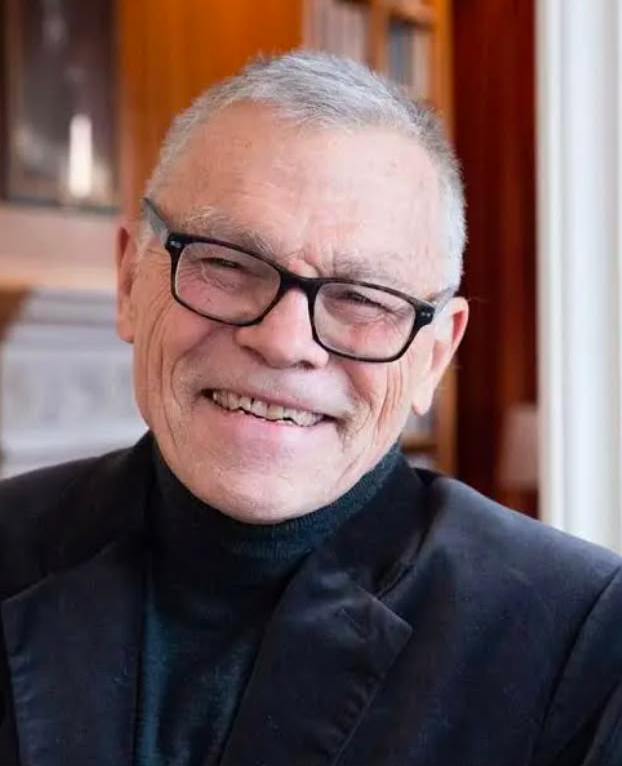
- Tom Conley at the American Academy of Berlin in 2020
- Born: December 7, 1943; New Haven, Connecticut, USA
- Died: July 24, 2026
- Education: Lawrence University, Columbia University, University of Wisconsin–Madison
- Occupations: Writer, professor, translator
- Employer: Harvard University
- Known for: Early modern French literature, cartography, and cinema
- Notable work: Film Hieroglyphs, The Self-Made Map, An Errant Eye
- Spouse: Verena Andermatt Conley
- Children: 2
- Awards: Guggenheim Fellowship (2003), honorary doctorate from Université Blaise-Pascal (2011) American Academy of Arts and Sciences (2016)
- Website: Radcliffe Institute Profile

Tom Conley (1943-2026) was an American scholar of literature, cartography, and film. He was the Abbott Lawrence Lowell Research Professor in the Faculty of Arts and Sciences at Harvard University, and was formerly affiliated with the Departments of Visual and Environmental Studies and of Romance Languages and Literatures. He was noted for his interdisciplinary work exploring relations between space and writing in early modern France, the history of cartography, and cinema.

== Early life and education ==
Conley was born in New Haven, Connecticut, and grew up in a non-academic family. He studied at Lawrence University and Columbia University before completing his Ph.D. in French literature at the University of Wisconsin–Madison, where he also pursued art history and film studies. He later studied at the Sorbonne in Paris in 1968 as a Fulbright Fellow.

== Career ==
Before working at Harvard University, Conley was professor of French and Italian at the University of Minnesota from 1971 to 1995. He has held visiting appointments at the University of California-Berkeley (1978–79), the Graduate Center of the City University of New York (1985–87), Miami University (1992), UCLA (1995), L’Ecole nationale des chartes (2005), L’Ecole des hautes études en sciences sociales (2010 and 2011), and other institutions. In the spring and summer of 1998, respectively, he led a Folger Library Seminar and, at Harvard University, an NEH Summer Seminar on cartography and early modern French literature. In the summers of 2001 and 2004, he taught at the Institut d’études françaises d’Avignon. In 2003, he was a seminar leader at Cornell University's School for Critical Theory.

He was a fellow at the Institute for Research in the Humanities at the University of Wisconsin (1991), the Hermon Dunlap Smith Center for the History of Cartography (1992), Cornell University's Society for the Humanities (1998), the Radcliffe Institute for Advanced Study (2011–12), and the Garden and Landscape Division of the Dumbarton Oaks Research Center (2015–16). He was a residential fellow at the American Academy of Berlin (2020), and a Visiting Scholar in residence at Dumbarton Oaks Research (2022).

With Harvard Film Archive director Haden Guest, Conley co-curated the film series "Action, Action, Action: The Cinema of Raoul Walsh" (2013) and "Fortunes of the Western" (2014), for which he also contributed program notes.

Conley's awards include a Woodrow Wilson Fellowship (1965), a Fulbright Fellowship (1968), an American Council for Learned Societies Study Fellowship (1976), summer stipends from the National Endowment for the Humanities (1972, 1988, 1992), and a Guggenheim Fellowship (2003). He is a recipient of the Palmes Académiques for pedagogy (2002) and a Medal of Honor of the City of Tours. In 2011, the Université Blaise-Pascal (Clermont-Ferrand) awarded him an honorary doctorate. He was awarded a Berlin Prize from the American Academy in Berlin (2020).

He was a member of the Modern Language Association, the International Association for the History of Cartography, the Society of Cinema and Media Studies, the Renaissance Society of America, the Society for the History of Discoveries and the United States Handball Association. From 2000 to 2020, he and his spouse, Verena Conley, were faculty deans of Kirkland House at Harvard University.

== Scholarly works ==
Conley's scholarship examines the intersections of writing, space, and visual culture, with particular emphasis on early modern France, cartography, and film. His books include Film Hieroglyphs (1991; new edition 2006), The Graphic Unconscious in Early Modern French Writing (1992; paperback reprint 1996), The Self-Made Map: Cartographic Writing in Early Modern France (1996; new edition 2010), L’Inconscient graphique: Essai sur la lettre à la Renaissance (2000), Cartographic Cinema (2006), An Errant Eye: Topography and Poetry in Early Modern France (2011), À fleur de page: Voir et lire le texte de la Renaissance (2015), and Action, Action, Action: The Early Cinema of Raoul Walsh (2022), the first volume of a diptych to be followed by Walsh War Warner, covering 1939–1964 (under contract). He is also the author of Su realismo (1988), a critical study of Luis Buñuel’s Las Hurdes (1932), and co-editor, with T. Jefferson Kline, of the Wiley-Blackwell Companion to Jean-Luc Godard (2014).

=== Reception ===
The Self-Made Map (1996) was described in a review in Choice as a meaningful addition to the history of cartography, and was examined in detail in a review essay in The Medieval Review. His later study Action, Action, Action: The Early Cinema of Raoul Walsh (2022) was praised by film scholar George Toles as an "extraordinary addition to silent and early sound film history".

Among his more than 250 articles and book chapters are contributions to volumes in film studies such as The History of Cartography, Volume 3: The European Renaissance (2006), Cinema and Modernity (2007), the Wiley-Blackwell companions to Michael Haneke (2010), Fritz Lang (2013), Luis Buñuel (2013), and François Truffaut (2013). His essays have appeared in The Epic Film (2010), Film Analysis (2005), Opening André Bazin (2011), Burning Darkness: A Half-Century of Spanish Cinema (2005), Film, Theory and Philosophy (2009), and European Film Theory (2008).

In early modern literature, his work appears in A New History of French Literature (1989), The Cambridge Companion to Montaigne (2005), The History of Cartography, Volume 3: The European Renaissance (2006), La Satire dans tous ses états (2009), and French Global (2010), among others. Recent chapters include contributions to Walter Melion’s Mixti Moti (2024).

Conley also translated major works of theory and cultural history, including Michel de Certeau’s The Writing of History (1988; new edition 1992), The Capture of Speech and Other Political Writings (1997), and Culture in the Plural (1997); Gilles Deleuze’s The Fold: Leibniz and the Baroque (1993); Jean-Louis Schefer’s Paolo Uccello, The Deluge, the Plague (1995); Réda Bensmaïa’s The Year of Passages (1992); Marc Augé’s In the Metro (2003) and Casablanca: Movies and Memory (2009); and Christian Jacob’s The Sovereign Map (2006).

== Awards ==
- 1990-91 –Fellow, Institute for Research in the Humanities, Madison
- 1992 (Jan–June) – Hermon Dunlap Smith Fellowship in the History of Cartography, Newberry Library
- 1998 (Spring) – A. D. White House Fellow, Cornell University
- 1998 – NEH Summer Seminar Leader on Cartography and Early Modern French Literature
- 1999, 2000, 2001 – nomination, Levinson Award for Outstanding Undergraduate Teaching, Harvard University
- 2001 – Chevalier de l’Ordre des Palmes Académiques
- 2002 – Walter Channing Cabot Fellow, Harvard University
- 2003–04 – John Simon Guggenheim Fellowship
- 2011–12 – research fellow, Radcliffe Institute for Advanced Study (declined Research Fellowships at Stanford Humanities Center, Dumbarton Oaks, Institute for Research in the Humanities)
- 2011 (Dec.) – honorary doctorate, Université Blaise-Pascal, Clermont-Ferrand (France)
- 2015–16 – research fellow in Garden and Landscape Studies, Dumbarton Oaks Research Collections
- 2016 – elected to the American Academy of Arts and Sciences
- 2020 (Spring) – Berlin Prize, American Academy in Berlin
- 2022 (Spring) – Visiting Scholar, Dumbarton Oaks, Washington DC
- 2025 – Everett Mendelsohn Award for Outstanding Mentorship and Advising in the Graduate School of Arts & Sciences, Harvard University

== Selected publications ==
=== Books ===
- Conley, Tom (2022-06-01). Action, Action, Action. SUNY Press. doi:10.1515/9781438488875. ISBN 978-1-4384-8887-5.
- Conley, Tom (2015). À fleur de page: voir et lire le texte de la Renaissance. Études et essais sur la Renaissance. Paris: Classiques Garnier. ISBN 978-2-8124-3248-4.
- Conley, Tom (2011-01-29). An Errant Eye: Poetry and Topography in Early Modern France. University of Minnesota Press. doi:10.5749/minnesota/9780816669646.001.0001. ISBN 978-0-8166-6964-6.</ref>
- Conley, Tom. Cartographic Cinema. U of Minnesota Press. ISBN 978-1-4529-0894-6.
- Conley, Tom (2000). L' inconscient graphique: essai sur l'écriture de la Renaissance ; (Marot, Ronsard, Rabelais, Montaigne) (in French). Presses Univ. de Vincennes.
- The Graphic Unconscious in Early Modern French Writing. Cambridge; New York; Melbourne: Cambridge University Press, 1992, ISBN 0-521-41031-2.
- Film Hieroglyphs: ruptures in classical cinema. Minneapolis: University of Minnesota Press, 2006, ISBN 978-0-8166-4970-9.
- Cartographic Cinema. Minneapolis; London: University of Minnesota Press, 2007, ISBN 978-0-8166-4356-1.

=== Short Monographs ===
- Su realismo: Lectura de Buñuel, "Tierra sin pan." Valencia, Spain: Centro de Semiótica y Teoría del Espectáculo (Documentos de trabajo, v. 6), 1988. 43 pp.
- Theaters of Cruelty: Wars of Religion, Violence, and The New World. Chicago: The Newberry Library (Transatlantic Encounter Slide Set 14), 1990. 34 pp. + 6 ill.
- Les Mistons’ & Undercurrents of French New Wave Cinema. The Norman and Jane Geske Lecture Series 8. Lincoln, Nebraska: The Hixson-Lied College of Fine & Performing Arts, 2003. 35 pp.

=== Translations ===
- Jacob, Christian (2006). The sovereign map: theoretical approaches in cartography throughout history. Translated by Conley, Tom. Chicago, Ill.: Univ. of Chicago Press. ISBN 9780226389530.
- Augé, Marc (2009). Casablanca: movies and memory. Translated by Conley, Tom. Minneapolis (u.a.): Univ. of Minnesota Press. ISBN 978-0816656417.
- Augé, Marc (2008). In the metro. Translated by Conley, Tom (Nachdr. ed.). Minneapolis: Univ. of Minnesota Press. ISBN 9780816634378.
- Certeau, Michel de (1997). The Capture of Speech and Other Political Writings. Translated by Conley, Tom. University of Minnesota Press. ISBN 978-0-8166-2769-1.
- Certeau, Michel de (1988). The Writing of History. Translated by Conley, Tom. Columbia University Press. ISBN 978-0-231-05575-8.
- Buchanan, Ian; Gilles, Deleuze; Conley, Tom (1994). "The Fold: Leibniz and the Baroque". SubStance. 23 (3): 124. doi:10.2307/3685373. ISSN 0049-2426. JSTOR 3685373.
- Uccello, Paolo [The Deluge, the Plague]. Benezit Dictionary of Artists. Translated by Conley, Tom. Oxford University Press. 2011-10-31. doi:10.1093/benz/9780199773787.article.b00186676.
- Bensmaïa, Réda (2008). The year of passages. Theory out of bounds. Translated by Conley, Tom (Nachdr. ed.). Minneapolis: University of Minnesota Press. ISBN 978-0-8166-2393-8.

=== Translations of Books ===
- Michel de Certeau, The Writing of History. New York: Columbia University Press, 1988; 368 pp.; with introduction (revised paperback edition 1992). ISBN 9780231055758
- Jean Louis Schefer, The Deluge, the Plague: Paolo Uccello. Ann Arbor: U of Michigan P, 1995. xi + 144 pp., with introduction; foreword by Stephen Bann.ISBN 0472095196
- Michel de Certeau, Culture in the Plural. Minneapolis: University of Minnesota Press, 1997. Introduction by Luce Giard. With an Afterword. xv + 180 pp.ISBN 9780816627677
- Christian Jacob, The Sovereign Map: Theoretical Approaches in Cartography throughout History. Chicago: University of Chicago Press, 2006. [xxiv + 417 pp.]ISBN 9780226389530
- Marc Augé, Casablanca: Movies and Memory. With an afterword. Minneapolis: University of Minnesota Press, 2009. 104 pp.doi:10.1111/J.1548-1360.2010.01063.X

=== Co-Edited Books ===
- Identity Papers: Contested Nationhood in 20^{th} century France, co-edited with Steven Ungar (Minneapolis: U of Minnesota Press, 1996). Ix + 299 pp. With an Afterword.
- The World and its Rival: Essays in Honor of Per Nykrog (Amsterdam: Rodopi Editions, 1999). 250 pp.
- Falso Movimento: Ensaios sobre escrita e cinema, co-edited with Clara Rowland (Lisbon: Cotovia, 2016). 280 pp. + 70 ill.

=== Journal articles ===
- Conley, Tom (2003). "From Detail to Periphery: All French Literature Is Francophone". Yale French Studies (103): 166–176. doi:10.2307/3182544. ISSN 0044-0078. JSTOR 3182544.
- Conley, Tom (2000), "III. Ronsard et le sonnet-figure", L'Inconscient graphique, Presses universitaires de Vincennes, pp. 99–129, doi:10.4000/books.puv.981, ISBN 978-2-84292-079-1
- Conley, Tom (2008-01-01). "Le métier d'écrire". L'Homme (185–186): 333–342. doi:10.4000/lhomme.24186. ISSN 0439-4216.
- Conley, Tom (2011-01-29), "The Apian Way", An Errant Eye, University of Minnesota Press, pp. 53–80, doi:10.5749/minnesota/9780816669646.003.0003, ISBN 978-0-8166-6964-6
- Conley, Tom (2009). "A Devil in Diversion: Number and Line in the Essais". Configurations. 17 (1): 87–103. doi:10.1353/con.0.0068. ISSN 1080-6520.
- Conley, Tom (2005). "Cinema and its Discontents: Jacques Ranciere and Film Theory". SubStance. 34 (3): 96–106. doi:10.1353/sub.2005.0038. ISSN 1527-2095.
- Conley, Tom (2004). "A Fable of Film: Ranciere's Anthony Mann". SubStance. 33 (1): 91–107. doi:10.1353/sub.2004.0003. ISSN 1527-2095.
- Conley, Tom (2003). "A Writing of Space: On French Critical Theory in 1973 and its Aftermath". Diacritics. 33 (3): 189–203. doi:10.1353/dia.2006.0005. ISSN 1080-6539.
