= Czesław Lejewski =

Polish philosopher

Czesław Lejewski (1913 in Minsk – 2001 in Doncaster) was a Polish philosopher and logician, and a member of the Lwow-Warsaw School of Logic. He studied under Jan Łukasiewicz and Karl Popper in the London School of Economics, and W. V. O. Quine.

== "Logic and Existence" ==
In his paper "Logic and Existence" (1954–55) Lejewski presented a version of free logic. He began by presenting the problem of non-referring nouns, and commended Quine for resisting the temptation to solve the problem by saying that non-referring names are meaningless. Quine's solution, however, was that we must first decide whether our name refers before we know how to treat it logically. Lejewski found this unsatisfactory because there should be a formal distinction between referring and non-referring names. He went on to write, "This state of affairs does not seem to be very satisfactory. The idea that some of our rules of inference should depend on empirical information, which may not be forthcoming, is so foreign to the character of logical inquiry that a thorough re-examination of the two inferences (existential generalization and universal instantiation) may prove worth our while." (parenthesis not Lejewski's).

He then elaborates a very creative formal language: Take a domain consisting of a and b, and two signs 'a' and 'b' which refer to these elements. There is one predicate, Fx. There is no need for universal or existential quantification, in the style of Quine in his Methods of Logic. The only possible atomic statements are Fa and Fb. We now introduce new signs but no new elements in the domain. 'c' refers to neither element and 'd' refers to either. Thus, $(Fa \lor Fb) \leftrightarrow Fd$ is true. We now introduce the predicate Dx which is true for d. We have no reason, here, to contend that $(x=c) \land (x\text{ exists})$, and thus to claim that there is something which does not exist. We simply do not have good reason to make existential claims about the referent of every sign, since that would assume that every sign refers. Instead, we should remain agnostic until we have better information. By the stipulations given here, however, we have downright good reason to be atheists about c, and have good reason to still claim $\forall x(x\text{ exists})$ to boot.

Lejewski calls this account the unrestricted interpretation. The restricted interpretation is then the language which does not distinguish between signs and elements, and so is forced to claim $\exists x\,(x\text{ does not exist})$ is true. It is obvious that everything expressible in the unrestricted interpretation is expressible in the restricted interpretation. A generalization to infinite domains and infinite signs is easy. A generalization to infinite predicates needs no explanation.

A convenient fact is that this logic can also accommodate the domain of the null set, as quantificational claims will not need to assume an element in the domain. For example, $\forall x\,Fx \rightarrow (\exists x\,Fx)$ will be true on an empty domain using the unrestricted interpretation, where 'c' still does not refer. The proof is that, assuming the antecedent true, we must understand the quantifiers to make no claims about the elements of the domain but only about the signs. He thus suggests that we abandon the interpretation of existential quantification as "there exists an x" and replace it with "for some (sign) x" (parenthesis not Lejewski's). He also suggests that the inference corresponding to existential generalization be termed "particular generalization". Where it is correct to apply the predicate Fx to every sign in the domain, it is correct to apply the predicate to a given sign in the domain. Thus the conditional is true. (Hence the treatment above that distinguishes existential quantification and the meta-linguistic statement 'x exists'.) Using the restricted interpretation, we see that the claim becomes $\forall x(x\text{ exists} \rightarrow Fx) \rightarrow \exists x\,(x\text{ exists and }Fx)$ which is false. The main antecedent is vacuously true. This is because nothing exists and so, for every sign, the inner antecedent is false, and so vacuously true. The consequent is false, because where the antecedent is true the consequent tells us that something exists. In the null set, this is always false. Quine's response to the problem of the empty set had been that it was a problem never faced in reality, which Lejewski found unsatisfying.

Lejewski then goes on to extend this interpretation to the language of inclusion, and presents an axiomatization of an unrestricted logic.

This logic was later developed more fully by Karel Lambert, who called the unrestricted interpretation "free logic". Instead of the meta-linguistic 'x exists', Lambert adopted the symbolization E!x, which can be axiomatized without existential quantification.

== Selected works ==
- "Logic and Existence". British Journal for the Philosophy of Science 5 (1954-5), pp. 104–119.
- "On Leśniewski's Ontology", Ratio 1 (1958), pp. 150–176.
- "On Implicational Definitions", Studia Logica 8 (1958), pp. 189–205.
- "A Re-Examination of the Russellian Theory of Descriptions", Philosophy 35 (1960), pp. 14–29.
- "On Prosleptic Syllogisms", Notre Dame Journal of Formal Logic 2 (1961), pp. 158–176.
- "Aristotle's syllogistic and its extensions",Synthese 15 (1963), pp. 125–154.
- "Ancient Logic", section in Prior, A. N., "Logic, History of, " The Encyclopedia of Philosophy, 1967, vol. 4, pp. 513–520.
- "Jan Łukasiewicz", section in The Encyclopedia of Philosophy, 1967, Vol. 5, pp. 104–107.
- "On Prosleptic Premisses", Notre Dame Journal of Formal Logic 17 (1976), pp. 1–18.
- "Accommodating the informal notion of class within the framework of Lesniewski's Ontology", Dialectica 39 (1985), pp, 217-241.
- "Formalization of functionally complete propositional calculus with the functor of implication as the only primitive term", Studia Logica 48 (1989), pp. 479–494.
