= Max Cresswell =

New Zealand philosopher and logician (1939–2024)

- Born: Maxwell John Cresswell; 19 November 1939; Wellington, New Zealand
- Died: 22 September 2024 (aged 84); Palmerston North, New Zealand
- Relatives: Lyell Cresswell (brother); Adriane Rini (wife); Mary Cresswell (ex-wife); Miriam Meyerhoff (step-daughter)

Education
- Education: Victoria University of Manchester
- Thesis: General and Specific Logics of Functions of Propositions (1964)
- Doctoral advisor: G. E. Hughes, A. N. Prior

Philosophical work
- Era: Contemporary philosophy
- Region: Western philosophy
- School: Analytic
- Main interests: Modal logic, metaphysics, formal semantics
- Notable ideas: Semantics of degree

Maxwell John Cresswell (19 November 1939 – 22 September 2024) was a New Zealand philosopher and logician who was known for his work in modal logic.

== Education and career ==
Cresswell received his B.A. in 1960 and M.A. in 1961 from the University of New Zealand and then with the support of a Commonwealth Scholarship attended the Victoria University of Manchester, where he received in 1964 his PhD under the supervision of A. N. Prior. Cresswell's thesis was titled General and Specific Logics of Functions of Propositions. After returning to New Zealand, Cresswell was at Victoria University of Wellington, from 1963 to 1967 as a lecturer, from 1968 to 1972 as a senior lecturer (also receiving in 1972 a Lit.D. from Victoria University), becoming a reader in 1973, and then a professor from 1974 to 2000, interrupted by several visiting professorships. In 2001 he became professor emeritus and a member of the Centre for Logic, Language and Computation, Victoria University of Wellington and has been a visiting or fixed-term professor at several universities.

Cresswell's research deals with the philosophy of logic, modal logic and formal semantics. He has also published on ancient Greek philosophy, on the logic of the nineteenth century, and on the philosophy of John Locke. With his colleague and former teacher George Edward Hughes, Cresswell was the co-author of An Introduction to Modal Logic, London, Methuen, 1968); this was the first modern textbook on modal logic and introduced many students to Kripke semantics.

Cresswell died in Palmerston North on 22 September 2024, at the age of 84.

== Publications ==
=== Monographs and collections ===
- with G. E. Hughes, An Introduction to Modal Logic, London, Methuen, 1968, German trans.: Einführung in die Modallogik. Berlin, New York : de Gruyter, 1978
- Logics and Languages, London, Methuen, 1973, German trans.: Die Sprachen der Logik und die Logik der Sprache, Berlin, New York : de Gruyter, 1979
- with G. E. Hughes, A Companion to Modal Logic, London, Methuen, 1984
- Structured Meanings: The Semantics of Propositional Attitudes, Bradford Books/MIT Press, 1985
- Adverbial Modification, Dordrecht, Reidel, 1985
- Semantical Essays: Possible Worlds and Their Rivals, Dordrecht, Kluwer Academic Publishers, 1988
- Entities and Indices, Dordrecht, Kluwer, 1990
- Language in the World, Cambridge, Cambridge University Press, 1994
- Semantic Indexicality, Dordrecht, Kluwer, 1996
- with G. E. Hughes, A New Introduction to Modal Logic, London, Routledge, 1996
