= Arthur Prior =

Logician and philosopher (1914–1969)

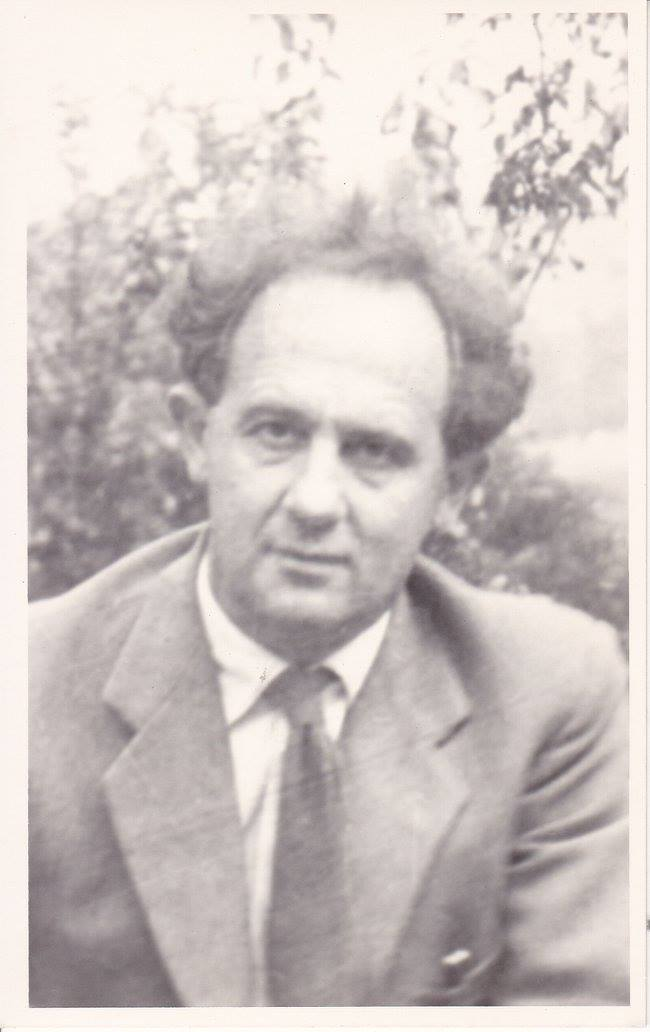
- Prior in 1959
- Born: Arthur Norman Prior; 4 December 1914; Masterton, New Zealand
- Died: 6 October 1969 (aged 54); Trondheim, Norway
- Spouses: Clare Hunter; Mary Wilkinson
- Relatives: Ian Prior (half-brother)

Education
- Education: Knox Theological Hall (attended); University of Otago (B.A., 1935; M.A., 1937)
- Academic advisor: J. N. Findlay

Philosophical work
- School: Analytic philosophy
- Institutions: Canterbury University College
- Doctoral students: Max Cresswell; Kit Fine
- Notable students: Genevieve Lloyd; Jonathan Bennett; Richard Routley
- Main interests: Philosophical logic; modal logic
- Notable ideas: Tense logic; hybrid logic; intensional logic; erotetic logic; Prior's tonk; Prior's intensional paradox; Prior's paradox of derived obligation

Arthur Norman Prior (4 December 1914 – 6 October 1969), usually cited as A. N. Prior, was a New Zealand–born logician and philosopher. Prior (1957) founded tense logic, now also known as temporal logic, and made important contributions to intensional logic, particularly in Prior (1971).

== Biography ==
Prior was born in Masterton, New Zealand, on 4 December 1914, the only child of Australian-born parents: Norman Henry Prior (1882–1967) and his wife, Elizabeth Munton Rothesay Teague (1889–1914). His mother died less than three weeks after his birth and he was cared for by his father's sister. His father, a medical practitioner in general practice, after war service at Gallipoli and in France—where he was awarded the Military Cross—remarried in 1920. There were three more children: Elaine, the epidemiologist Ian Prior, and Owen. Arthur Prior grew up in a prominent Methodist household. His two Wesleyan grandfathers, the Reverends Samuel Fowler Prior and Hugh Henwood Teague, were sent from England to South Australia as missionaries in 1875. The Prior family first moved to New Zealand in 1893.

As the son of a doctor, Prior at first considered becoming a biologist, but ended up focusing on theology and philosophy, graduating from the University of Otago in 1935 with a B.A. in philosophy. While studying for his B.A., Prior attended the seminary at Dunedin's Knox Theological Hall but decided against entering the Presbyterian ministry. J. N. Findlay introduced Prior to the study of logic. In 1936, Prior married Clare Hunter, a freelance journalist, and they spent several years in Europe, during which they tried to earn a living as writers. Daunted by the prospect of an invasion of Britain, he and Clare returned to New Zealand in 1940. At this point in his life he was a devout Presbyterian, though he became an atheist later in life.

After divorce from his first wife, he remarried in 1943 to Mary Wilkinson, with whom he would have two children. Wilkinson was renamed Mary Laura Prior, and coauthored a paper on Erotetic Logic with Arthur, published in the Philosophical Review in 1955. Arthur served in the Royal New Zealand Air Force from 1943 to 1945 as a radio mechanic. Arthur and Mary kept their correspondence from the war, and it is now a part of the Ann Prior Collection at the Bodleian Library. The correspondence is known as the Wartime letters, spans more than several thousand pages and contains much important information about the development of Prior's view on several philosophical and theological matters. Transcriptions of the letters are published at the Arthur Prior Digital Archive. After the war, Prior embarked on an academic career at Canterbury University College in February 1946. His first position was a lectureship which had become available when Karl Popper left the university.

After returning to New Zealand following a year at Oxford as a visiting lecturer, he took up a professorship in 1959 at Manchester University, where he remained until he was elected a Fellow of Balliol College, Oxford in 1966 and appointed a Reader. He continued his Manchester practice of accepting visiting professorships.

Arthur Prior went to give lectures at Norwegian universities in September 1969 and on 6 October 1969, the night before he was to deliver a lecture there, he died from a heart attack in Trondheim, Norway.

== Professional life ==
Prior was educated entirely in New Zealand, where he was fortunate to have come under the influence of J. N. Findlay, under whom he wrote his M.A. thesis on 'The Nature of Logic'. While Prior was very fond of the theology of Karl Barth, his early criticism of Barth's adherence to philosophical idealism, is a mark of Findlay's influence on Prior.

He began teaching philosophy and logic at Canterbury University College in February 1946, filling the vacancy created by Karl Popper's resignation. In 1951, Prior met J. J. C. Smart, also known as "Jack" Smart, at a philosophical conference in Australia and the two developed a lifelong friendship. Their correspondence was influential on Prior's development of tense logic. Smart adhered to the tenseless theory of time and was never persuaded by Prior's arguments, though Prior was influential in making Smart skeptical about Wittgenstein's view on pseudo-relations. He became a professor in 1953. Thanks to the good offices of Gilbert Ryle, who had met Prior in New Zealand in 1954, Prior spent the year 1956 on leave at the University of Oxford, where he gave the John Locke lectures in philosophy. These were subsequently published as Time and Modality (1957). This is a seminal contribution to the study of tense logic and the metaphysics of time, in which Prior championed the A-theorist view that the temporal modalities of past, present and future are basic ontological categories of fundamental importance for our understanding of time and the world. Prior was several times warned by J. J. C. Smart against making tense-logic the topic of his John Locke lectures. Smart feared that tense-logic would get Prior "involved in side issues, even straight philosophy, and not in the stuff that will do Oxford most good." Prior was, however, convinced that tense-logic had the potential to benefit logic, as well as philosophy, and thus he considered his lectures an "expression of a conviction that formal logic and general philosophy have more to bring to one another than is sometimes supposed".

During his time at Oxford, Prior met Peter Geach and William Kneale, influenced John Lemmon, and corresponded with the adolescent Saul Kripke. Logic in the United Kingdom was then in a rather low state, being "deeply out of fashion and its practitioners were isolated and somewhat demoralized." Prior arranged a Logical Colloquium which brought together such logicians as John Lemmon, Peter Geach, Czesław Lejewski and more. The colloquiums were a great success and, together with Prior's John Locke lecture and his visits around the country, he helped revitalize British logic. From 1959 to 1966, he was Professor of Philosophy at the University of Manchester, having taught Osmund Lewry. From 1966 until his death he was Fellow and Tutor in philosophy at Balliol College, Oxford. His students include Max Cresswell, Kit Fine, and Robert Bull.

Almost entirely self-taught in modern formal logic, Prior published four major papers on logic in 1952, when he was 38 years of age, shortly after discovering the work of Józef Maria Bocheński and Jan Łukasiewicz, despite very little of Łukasiewicz's work being translated into English. He went so far as to read untranslated Polish texts without being able to speak Polish claiming "the symbols are so illuminating that the fact that the text is incomprehensible doesn't much matter". He went on to employ Polish notation throughout his career. Prior (1955) distills much of his early teaching of logic in New Zealand. Prior's work on tense logic provides a systematic and extended defense of a tensed conception of reality in which propositional statements can change truth value over time.

Prior stood out by virtue of his strong interest in the history of logic. He was one of the first English-speaking logicians to appreciate the nature and scope of the logical work of Charles Sanders Peirce, and the distinction between de dicto and de re in modal logic. Prior to this, he taught and researched modal logic before Kripke proposed his possible worlds semantics for it, at a time when modality and intensionality commanded little interest in the English-speaking world, and had even come under sharp attack by Willard Van Orman Quine.

His work is now said to be the precursor of hybrid logic. Undertaking (in one section of his book Past, Present, and Future (1967)) the attempt to combine binary (e.g., "until") and unary (e.g., "will always be") temporal operators to one system of temporal logic, Prior—as an incidental result—builds a base for later hybrid languages.

His work Time and Modality explored the use of a many-valued logic to explain the problem of non-referring names.

Prior's work was both philosophical and formal and provides a productive synergy between formal innovation and linguistic analysis. Natural language, he remarked, can embody folly and confusion as well as the wisdom of our ancestors. He was scrupulous in setting out the views of his adversaries, and provided many constructive suggestions about the formal development of alternative views.

He possessed an intellectual purity and a devotion to the subject that I immediately recognized and have always attempted to emulate (Kit Fine)

== Publications ==
The following books were either written by Prior or are posthumous collections of journal articles and unpublished papers that he wrote:

- 1949. Logic and the Basis of Ethics. Oxford University Press (ISBN 0-19-824157-7)
- 1955, 1962. Formal Logic. Oxford University Press.
- 1957. Time and Modality. Oxford University Press. Based on his 1956 John Locke lectures.
- 1962. "Changes in Events and Changes in Things". University of Kansas.
- 1967. Past, Present and Future. Oxford University Press.
- 1968. Papers on Time and Tense. Oxford University Press.
- 1971. Objects of Thought. Edited by P. T. Geach and A. J. P. Kenny. Oxford University Press.
- 1976. The Doctrine of Propositions and Terms. Edited by P. T. Geach and A. J. P. Kenny. London: Duckworth.
- 1976. Papers in Logic and Ethics. Edited by P. T. Geach and A. J. P. Kenny. London: Duckworth.
- 1977. Worlds, Times and Selves. Edited by Kit Fine. London: Duckworth.
- 2003. Papers on Time and Tense. Second expanded edition by Per Hasle, Peter Øhrstrøm, Torben Braüner & Jack Copeland. Oxford University Press.
