= Robert Wiremu =

New Zealand singer, composer and music educator (1970–2026)

- Born: 16 September 1970
- Died: 18 July 2026 (aged 55)
- Occupations: Composer, singer, educator
- Era: Contemporary

Robert Spencer Wiremu (16 September 1970 – 18 July 2026) was a New Zealand composer, baritone singer, music educator and choral director.

== Life and career ==
Wiremu was born on 16 September 1970 of Ngāti Kahungunu, Ngāti Porou and Tūwharetoa descent and spent his childhood in Whanganui and Flaxmere, Hastings. His parents, Rauhina and Robert Williams, were both musical and his father had played the horn in the band at Rātana Pā. He began piano lessons as a child encouraged by his grandmother.

He studied composition with Jack Body, David Farquhar and Ross Harris and singing with Emily Mair at Victoria University of Wellington. After completing his music degree he moved to Auckland in 1993 to study singing with Beatrice Webster at the university. He did further study in Brisbane in 1998 before taking up Webster's position at the university where he taught voice and musicianship. He sang baritone in several choirs including the New Zealand Secondary Students’ Choir (NZSSC), the New Zealand Youth Choir (NZYC), Voices New Zealand, the World Youth Choir and in Opera New Zealand.

As a music educator he conducted and was vocal coach and pianist to the NZSSC and the NZYC and a variety of other groups such as NZ Choral Federation (NZCF), the Auckland Chamber Choir, the Auckland Choral Society, NZ Opera and the NZ Singing School. He also taught music at Westlake Girls High School. In 2007 as interim artistic director of the NZSSC he took the choir to perform in Brazil and Argentina.

From the 1990s Wiremu was involved with the Opera in the Pā an arts event held at Rotowhio Marae, Te Puia, Rotorua. He became musical director of the event.

In 2012 Te Papa museum in Wellington acquired the artwork He Korero Purakau mo te Awanui o te Motu: story of a New Zealand river by Michael Parakōwhai. It is a Steinway grand piano painted red and carved. Wiremu was invited to play it in a series of performances at Te Papa.

His composing and arranging was influenced by his Māori heritage. In 2019 he arranged the waiata Waerenga-a-Hika by Tuirina Wehi for the New Zealand Youth Choir. The waiata commemorates the 1865 battle between the Crown and local Māori at the Waerenga-a-Hika pā near Gisborne. He collaborated with Māori language promoter Pānia Papa to create Toiere, a work that combines arias from classical music, Māori waiata and the Māori language. Papa translated the lyrics of arias by Bizet, Rossini, Mozart, Offenbach and Verdi into Māori, and Wiremu arranged the music. The waiata included a new one, Te Iere Tōiri which was written to honour Dame Kiri te Kanawa. Toiere was performed at the Auckland Arts Festival in 2025.

Wiremu's work Te Kai a Te Rangatira set to music speeches by Māori leaders: Rose Pere, Moana Jackson, Ricky Houghton, Te Puea Hērangi, Āpirana Ngata, and Whina Cooper. Written for baritone and chamber ensemble it was commissioned for the IO Festival Kaitaia. Wiremu then arranged Whina Cooper's speech for vocal ensemble; Whina said... was performed by the King's Singers on their 2026 tour of New Zealand.

In 2023, Wiremu wrote Reimagining Mozart which commemorated the Erebus disaster when an Air New Zealand aircraft crashed into Mt Erebus in 1979. Wiremu imagined that a passenger on the plane might have had a Walkman playing Mozart's Requiem at the time of impact and the sounds of music floated away over Antarctica. Taking the unfinished Requiem he reworked it for choir and instrumental ensemble. It was performed in six places in New Zealand in 2023, in Hamburg and by the BBC Singers and Voices New Zealand in London.

Wiremu served on the boards of several music organisations: Choirs Aotearoa, the Kiri Te Kanawa Foundation from 2021 and SOUNZ the New Zealand Centre for Music. He joined the board of SOUNZ in 2022, becoming co-chair in 2024.

Wiremu died on 18 July 2026, at the age of 55.
