= Concerto for seven wind instruments, timpani, percussion, and string orchestra =

1949 composition by Frank Martin

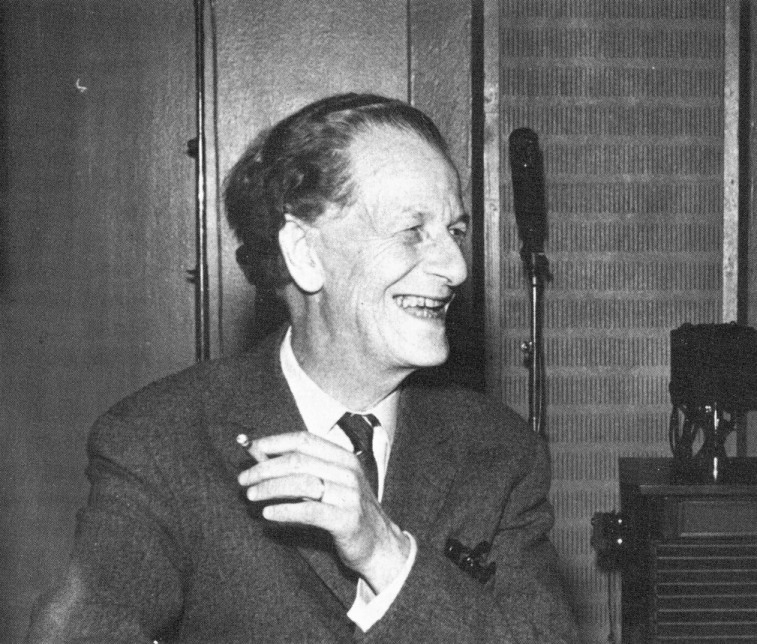
Frank Martin in 1960

Concerto for seven wind instruments, timpani, percussion, and string orchestra (published as Concerto pour sept instruments à vent, timbales, batterie et orchestre à cordes) is a composition by the Swiss composer Frank Martin.

Composed in 1949 for the Bern Musikgesellschaft, the first movement, Allegro, opens with the string players only, with the percussion only gradually coming to the forefront. The haunting second movement Adagietto is marked "mysterious and elegant", and is hallmarked by an ostinato figure on the strings, initially pizzicato before being taken up by the ensemble. Martin himself characterised the slow movement as being:

based entirely on a steady two-time beat, which serves as an accompaniment to the melodic elements: sometimes serene, sometimes dark and violent. A lyrical phrase first heard in the bassoon's upper register is repeated by the trombone with a gentle nobility at the conclusion.

The conductor Ernest Ansermet remarked that this movement called to mind an aria of Bach while at the same time seeming quite modern. The Allegro vivace finale features a series of solos, effectively a sonata rondo before the coda for full orchestra.

The Concerto, along with his Petite Symphonie Concertante, has proved to be one of Martin's most enduring works, having been recorded several times since its premiere at Bern under the German conductor Luc Balmer in October 1949. The work lasts for about twenty minutes: in the recordings below, Ernest Ansermet conducts it in under 19' whilst Matthias Bamert takes almost 22'.

== Recordings ==
- Winterthur Symphony Orchestra, Victor Desarzens, Nixa Records
- Suisse Romande Orchestra, Ernest Ansermet, Decca
- Chicago Symphony Orchestra, Jean Martinon, RCA Records
- West Flemish Orchestra, Dirk Varendonck, Harmonia Mundi
- Bavarian Radio Symphony Orchestra, Ernest Ansermet, Orfeo Records
- Chamber Orchestra of Europe, Thierry Fischer, Deutsche Grammophon
- Suisse Romande Orchestra, Armin Jordan, Erato Records
- London Philharmonic, Matthias Bamert, Chandos Records
- Royal Concertgebouw Orchestra, Riccardo Chailly, Decca
- National Orchestral Association, John Barnett, Carnegie Hall Recording Co. (acetate)
- Slovenian Philharmonic Orchestra, Patrick Fournillier, Slovenska filharmonija
