= David Squire =

New Zealand choral conductor, music educator, and adjudicator

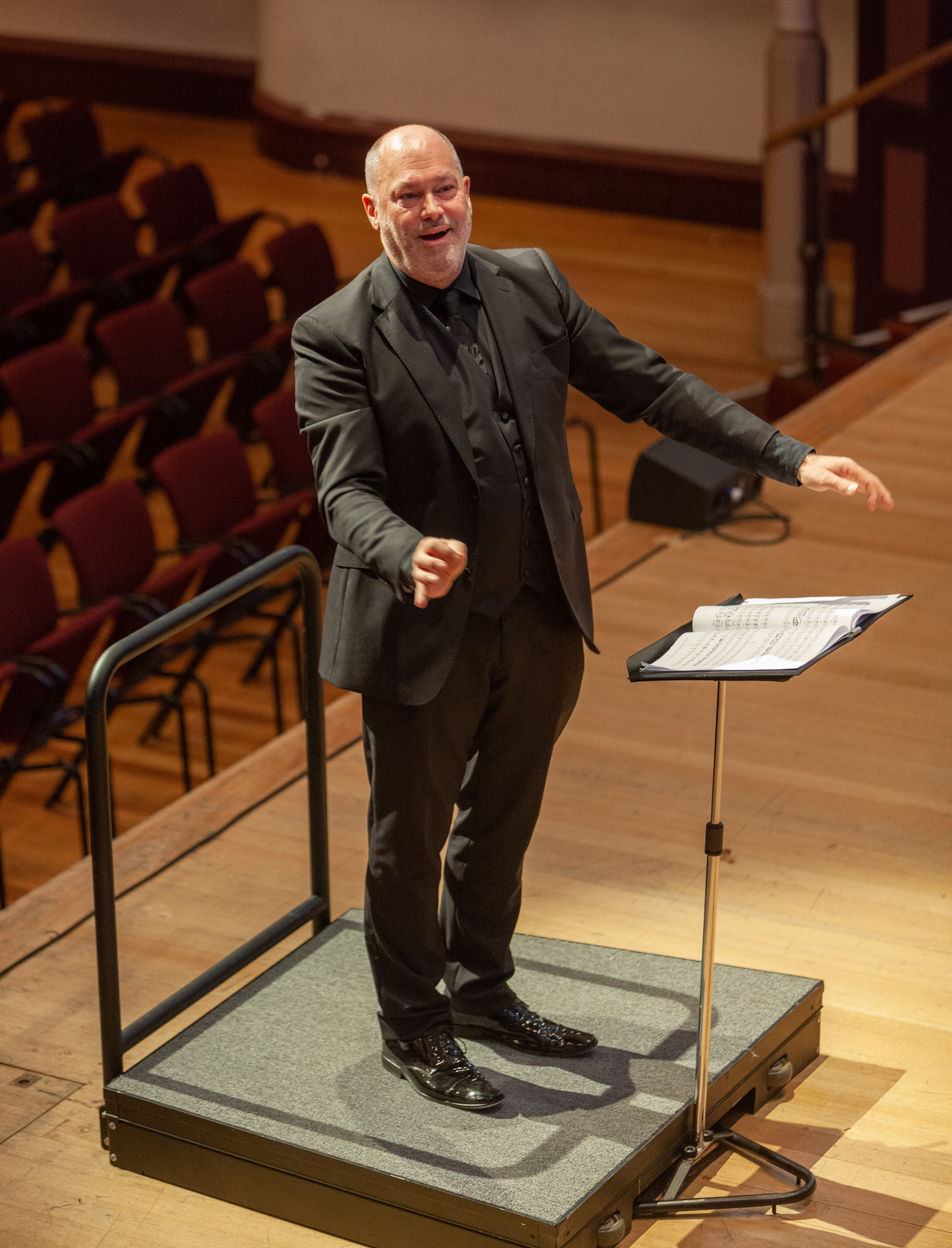
- Squire conducting at Auckland Town Hall
- Education: University of Auckland
- Occupations: Choral conductor, music educator, adjudicator
- Known for: Music Director of the New Zealand Youth Choir (2011–2025)

David Squire is a New Zealand choral conductor, music educator, and adjudicator. He is best known for serving as Music Director of the New Zealand Youth Choir from 2011 to 2025, leading the ensemble to major international successes including winning the Choir of the World title at the 2025 Llangollen International Musical Eisteddfod. Squire has directed numerous award-winning school, youth, and community ensembles in New Zealand and internationally.

== Early life and education ==
Squire studied music at the University of Auckland, focusing on conducting and composition. He later completed a Master of Music with first class honours in choral conducting, as well as a postgraduate diploma in music. His conducting teachers included Karen Grylls and Juan Matteucci, while his composition studies included work with John Rimmer (composer) and John Elmsly.

As a singer, Squire performed with several prominent New Zealand ensembles, including the Auckland Dorian Choir, Auckland Chamber Choir, the New Zealand Youth Choir, Voices New Zealand Chamber Choir, and the V8 Vocal Ensemble.

== Career ==
=== Music education and conducting ===
Squire has worked in secondary school music education for more than three decades, directing choirs, orchestras, and concert bands across Auckland schools including Westlake Boys High School, Westlake Girls High School, Kristin School, Rangitoto College, Takapuna Grammar School, and Orewa College.

He has directed several internationally recognised ensembles, including:

- Auckland Youth Choir
- Voicemale (Westlake Boys High School)
- Euphony (Kristin School)
- Westlake Symphony Orchestra

Under his leadership, these ensembles have won numerous national and international awards at festivals and competitions in New Zealand, Europe, and Asia. In 2018, Voicemale won the Grand Prix at the Leonardo da Vinci International Choral Festival in Florence, where Squire also received the award for Best Conductor. Euphony later represented New Zealand at the Budapest International Choral Festival, winning the Youth Choirs of Equal Voices category and placing in the Musica Sacra division.

Squire’s Westlake Symphony Orchestra has also achieved repeated success at the KBB Music Festival and international youth music festivals.

=== New Zealand Youth Choir ===
Squire became Music Director of the New Zealand Youth Choir (NZYC) in 2011, becoming the first alumnus of the choir to hold the position. During his tenure, the choir toured extensively throughout North America, Europe, Asia, Australia, and the Pacific.

Under Squire’s direction, NZYC won multiple international honours, including the Grand Prix at the International Festival of Academic Choirs in Pardubice, Czech Republic, in 2016. The choir also performed at major venues including the Walt Disney Concert Hall in Los Angeles, Notre-Dame Cathedral in Paris, and St John’s Smith Square in London.

In 2025, the choir won the Choir of the World title at the Llangollen International Musical Eisteddfod in Wales. Squire was additionally awarded the Jayne Davies Conductors Prize. During the same 2025 European tour under Squire's direction, the New Zealand Youth Choir also competed at the European Choir Games in Aarhus, Denmark, where the ensemble won multiple gold medals and category honours.

=== Other work ===
Beyond the concert stage, Squire has worked as a conductor, choir director, clinician, and adjudicator throughout New Zealand and internationally. His credits include:

- Choir director for the New Zealand film Tinā
- Choral director for Synthony in the Domain
- Recording work for Neil Finn’s album Out of Silence (Neil Finn album)
- Conducting and educational work with the International Schools Choral Music Society
- Guest conducting and adjudicating at international festivals in Singapore, the Philippines, China, and the United Arab Emirates

Squire has also conducted ensembles including the Auckland Philharmonia and St Matthew’s Chamber Orchestra.

== Professional leadership ==
Squire is a founding member, former Chair, and current Vice-Chair of the New Zealand Association of Choral Directors. He has also served as a governance board member of the New Zealand Choral Federation and has worked as a national conducting advisor and tutor.

In 2011, he received a New Zealander of the Year Local Heroes Medal for services to music education.

Squire has been profiled and interviewed by Radio New Zealand for his work in choral conducting and music education.

== Discography ==
With the New Zealand Youth Choir:

- Deep River (2013)
- NZYC: Live in London (2016)
- Hokorua: New Zealand Youth Choir 40 Years 1979–2019 (2019)
