= Emily Mair =

New Zealand opera singer and singing teacher (1928–2021)

Emily Jean Mair ONZM (16 May 1928 – 15 May 2021) was a Scottish-born New Zealand opera singer, pianist and vocal coach. She trained a number of well-known New Zealand opera singers, including Simon O'Neill and Aivale Cole.

== Early life ==
Mair was raised in Newmilns, Ayrshire where her father ran a lace-making factory. At age 15 she went to the Royal Scottish Academy of Music and Drama in Glasgow, later moving to the Royal College of Music in London where she studied piano with Arthur Benjamin and Antony Hopkins. In her third year she joined the opera school.

== Career ==
Mair sang in the BBC Chorus for three years. Between 1960 and 1962 she appeared three times (as Emily Maire) at Glyndebourne first as First Boy in Mozart's The Magic Flute in 1962. This was followed in 1961 and 1962 by singing Gianetta in Donezetti's L'Elisir d'amore.

In 1960 she moved to Liverpool where her husband Wilfred Simenauer took up the position of principal cello in the Royal Liverpool Philharmonic Orchestra. In Liverpool she entered a competition to be one of the 'Five New Discoveries' with the Liverpool Philharmonic and performed as Zerlina in Don Giovanni with the Liverpool Mozart Orchestra.

She emigrated to New Zealand in 1965 as Wilfred had been appointed principal cello with the NZBC Symphony Orchestra (now the New Zealand Symphony Orchestra). She performed in both oratorio and opera; Haydn's Creation in 1967 and with the New Zealand Opera Company as Adina in L'Elisir d'amore in 1967, Anna Truelove in Rake's Progress and Susanna in The Marriage of Figaro. She also performed with the Auckland Sinfonia and Canterbury Opera and in operas for Television New Zealand and with the New Opera Company in Wellington in the 1970s.

In 1987 she joined the staff of Victoria University of Wellington as a voice coach, receiving a Teaching Excellence Award in 1996. In 1988 she was invited to teach at the International Summer Vocal School in Salt Lake City, a role she had undertaken in Belgium in 1986.

Former students include Simon O'Neill, Robert Wiremu and Aivale Cole.

== Awards and honours ==
In the 2000 New Year Honours, Mair was appointed an Officer of the New Zealand Order of Merit, for services to music and singing.

== Personal life ==
She married Wilfred Simenauer, a New Zealand cellist, in England in 1951. They had three sons. She died in Wellington on 15 May 2021, one day before her 93rd birthday.
