= Guy Jansen =

New Zealand music educator (1935–2019)

Guy Jansen MNZM
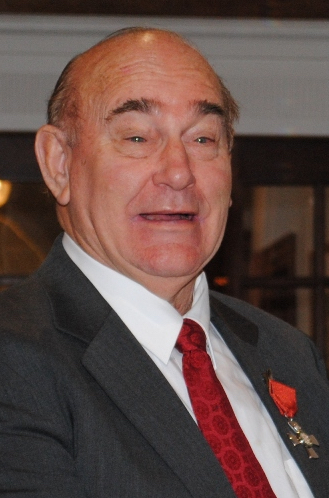
- Jansen in 2012
- Born: Guy Elwyn Jansen; 27 May 1935; Carterton, New Zealand
- Died: 27 May 2019 (aged 84)
- Spouse: Judy Mary Rolls (m. 1960)
- Children: 3

Academic background
- Education: University of Southern California
- Thesis: The aesthetic realm and choral music (1984)

Academic work
- Institutions: University of Queensland; Wheaton College Conservatory of Music

Guy Elwyn Jansen MNZM (27 May 1935 – 27 May 2019) was a New Zealand music educator and choral musician.

== Early life and family ==
Born in Carterton on 27 May 1935, Jansen was educated at Horowhenua College. In 1960, he married Judy Mary Rolls, and the couple went on to have three children.

== Education ==
Jansen studied at Victoria University College, graduating Bachelor of Arts in 1960. He completed a Diploma of Education at Wellington Teachers' College in 1963, and a Master of Arts by research in the history and literature of music at Victoria University of Wellington in 1966, with his master's thesis titled The History of School Music in New Zealand. In 1969, also at Victoria, he graduated Bachelor of Music. Jansen later undertook doctoral studies at the University of Southern California, the first New Zealander to do so, and was awarded the degree of Doctor of Musical Arts in 1984; his thesis was The Aesthetic Realm and Choral Music.

He was also a Fellow of Trinity College London (1969), and a Licentiate of the Royal Schools of Music (1968).

== Career ==
Jansen ran choral courses for secondary school students during the 1960s, and established the regional Choral Festival for Secondary Schools. Then, from 1975 to 1989, he was the Department of Education's national officer for music, responsible for music in primary and secondary schools. In 1979, Jansen established the New Zealand Youth Choir, serving as its musical director, and toured with the choir internationally in 1982. In 1986, he founded the New Zealand Secondary Students' Choir.

Jansen was intimately involved in the production of the New Zealand Hymnbook in 1986, and he was the first person to arrange the New Zealand national anthem, "God Defend New Zealand", with both English and Māori lyrics, for the New Zealand Youth Choir's 1982 tour. He was in the vanguard of the movement to widen the scope of church music, and was noted for the fusion of styles in his arrangements.

Also in 1986, Jansen set up the International Summer Schools in Choral Conducting, which he directed or co-directed in New Zealand and Queensland 14 times until 2011. After being appointed senior lecturer at the University of Queensland (UQ), he initiated a master's programme in choral and church music. Also at UQ, he established the University Chamber Singers, and was chair of the organising committee for the national conference of the Australian Society for Music Education in 1997. He later was choral conductor-in residence at the Wheaton College Conservatory of Music in Illinois.

In 1990, Jansen was awarded the New Zealand 1990 Commemoration Medal. In the 2011 Queen's Birthday Honours, he was appointed a Member of the New Zealand Order of Merit, for services to music. Later that year, at the 2011 Rugby World Cup, Jansen was one of the conductors for choirs singing the national anthems before tournament matches.

During 2012, Jansen spent six months in Darwin as a choral consultant, which including teaching a conducting course at Charles Darwin University, and working with indigenous children.

== Death ==
Jansen died on 27 May 2019.
