= Simon O'Neill =

New Zealand operatic tenor

Simon O'Neill ONZM
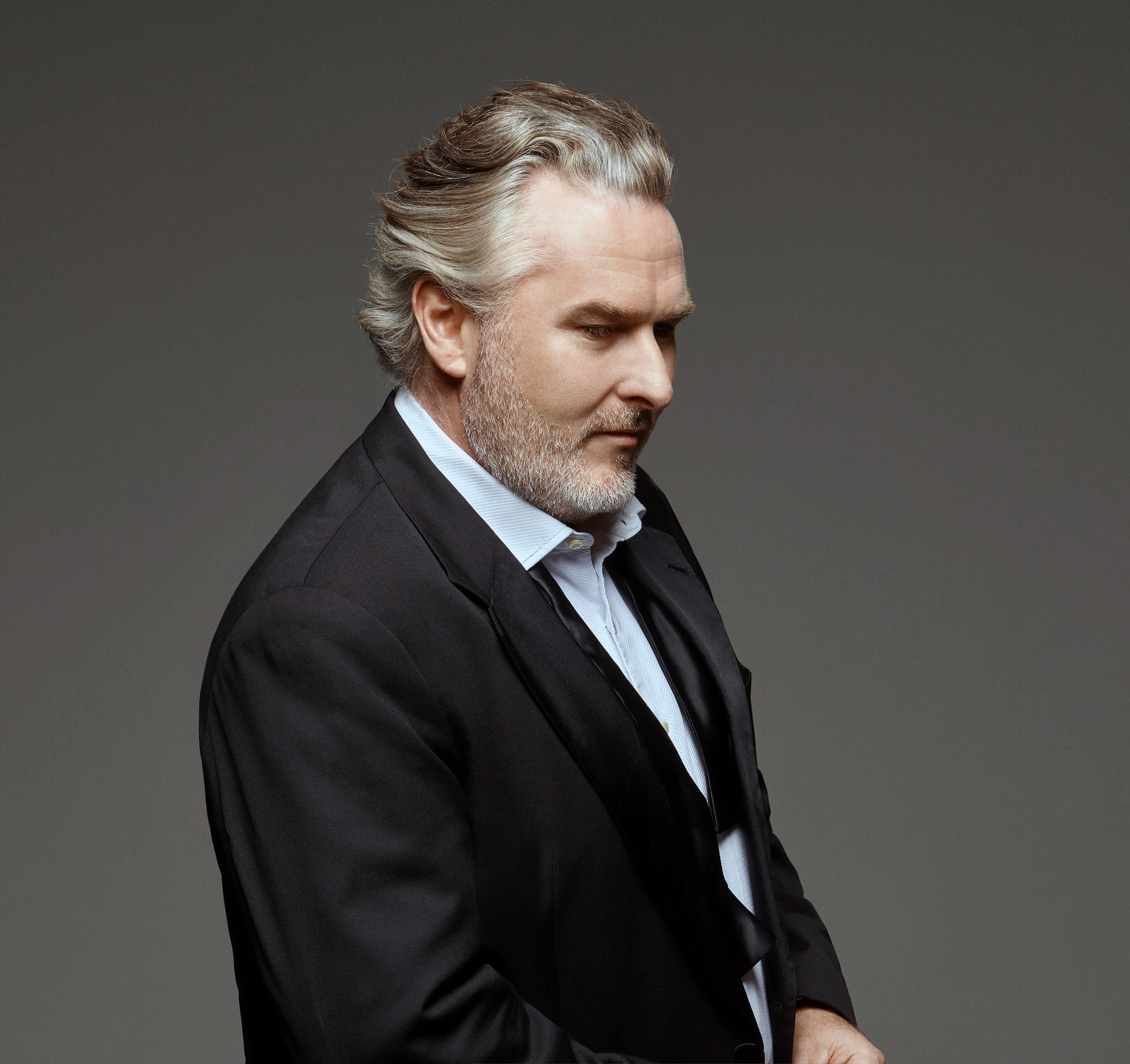
- O'Neill in 2018
- Born: 1971 (age 54–55); Ashburton, New Zealand
- Occupation: Operatic tenor
- Website: www.simononeill.com

Simon O'Neill ONZM (born 1971) is a New Zealand operatic tenor internationally recognised for his performances of the major Heldentenor roles in the operas of Richard Wagner. He has performed with many of the world’s opera companies, including the Metropolitan Opera, Royal Opera House, Teatro alla Scala, Vienna State Opera, and the Bayreuth Festival. In 1998, his image appeared on the New Zealand one-dollar performing arts postage stamp.

== Early life and education ==
O'Neill was born in Ashburton, New Zealand. He began studying piano at the age of seven with Mrs. Perkins demonstrating a strong aptitude for music from an early age. At eight, he joined the Ashburton Silver Band as second baritone, gaining early experience in brass performance and conducting. In 1992, he achieved success as the second E♭ bass player with the St Kilda Brass Band, contributing to their victory as New Zealand A Grade Champion Band. He began singing as bass in the New Zealand Secondary Students' Choir in 1989 and then the New Zealand Youth Choir 1990. His operatic debut was in 1995, performing the role of Turiddu in Cavalleria Rusticana at the Royal Whanganui Opera House.

He studied at the University of Otago (1993) and Victoria University of Wellington, graduating with a bachelors and an honours degree in music (1994). He later received scholarships, including a Fulbright Award to the Manhattan School of Music, where he earned a Master of Music degree in 2000, and to the Juilliard School’s Opera Center. In 2016, he was awarded a Doctor of Music honoris causa by Victoria University of Wellington.

While at the Juilliard Opera Center, O'Neill performed leading roles such as the title role in Idomeneo, Sam Polk in Susannah, and Chevalier de la Force in Dialogues des Carmélites under the baton of Julius Rudel. He later joined the San Francisco Opera’s Merola Opera Program and performed as Rodolfo in La bohème. and the title role in La clemenza di Tito with Wolf Trap Opera.

== Career ==
In 2004, O'Neill was featured in a TVNZ/BBC documentary, The Understudy, which followed his experience covering the role of Siegmund for Plácido Domingo in the Metropolitan Opera’s production of Die Walküre.

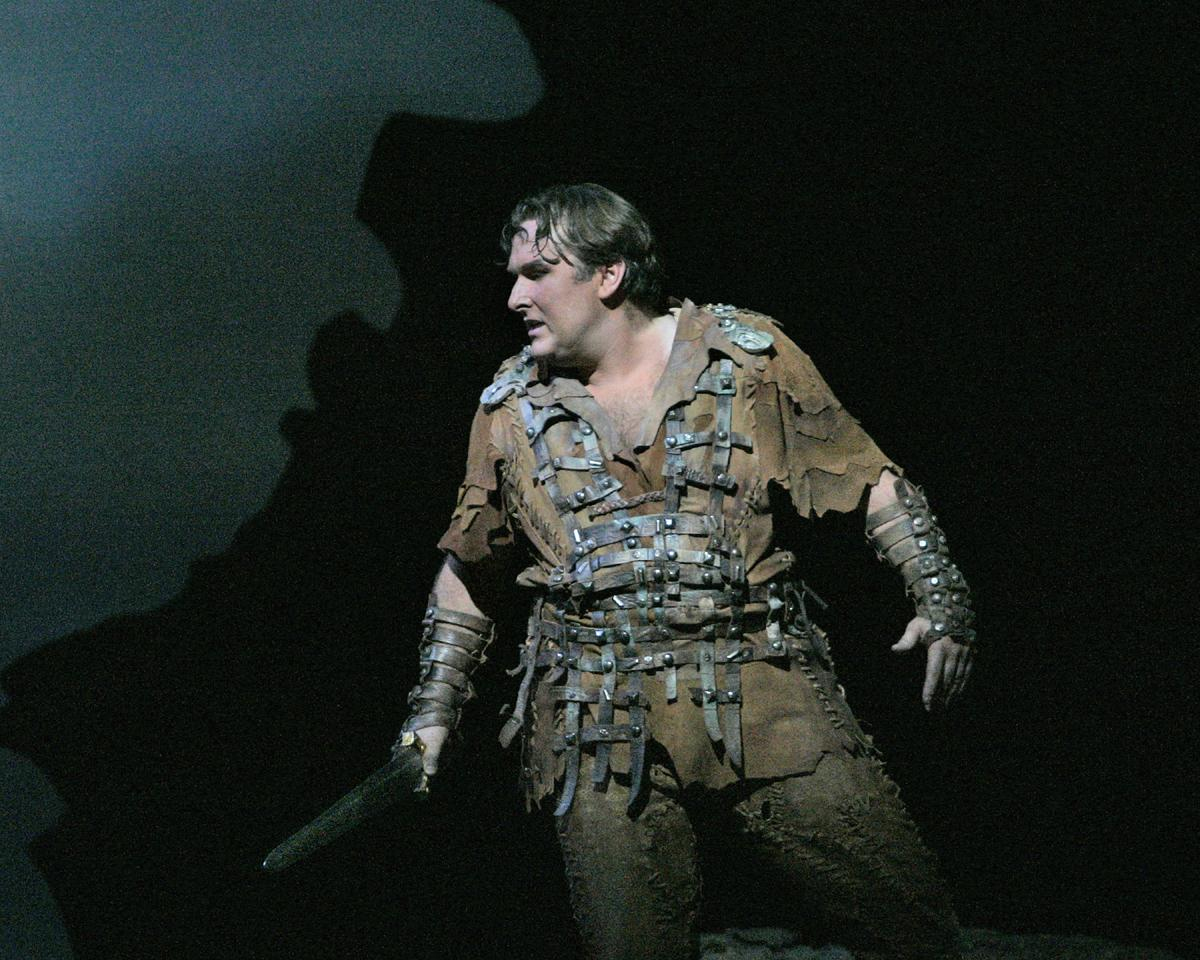
O'Neill as Siegmund in the Otto Schenk production of Die Walküre from the Metropolitan Opera.

This prestigious cover contract lead to his Metropolitan Opera debut (2006) as the Gran Sacerdote in Idomeneo, conducted by James Levine, and his debut at the Royal Opera House as Jenik in The Bartered Bride under Sir Charles Mackerras. Subsequent debuts included Florestan in Fidelio with Antonio Pappano, Die Zauberflöte at the Salzburg Festival with Riccardo Muti, and the title role in Parsifal at the Vienna State Opera with Christian Thielemann.

O'Neill has become especially associated with Wagnerian repertoire. He has performed Siegmund in Die Walküre at Covent Garden with Sir Antonio Pappano Teatro alla Scala, Berlin State Opera with Daniel Barenboim, Vienna Staatsoper with Franz Welser-Möst, Bavarian State Opera with Kent Nagano, Hamburgische Staatsoper with Simone Young, Deutsche Oper Berlin, and the Metropolitan Opera with Donald Runnicles and in the 2013 Otto Schenk Ring production and in the Robert Lepage production with Fabio Luisi.

In 2009, O’Neill sang the title role in Verdi’s Otello with Sir Colin Davis and the London Symphony Orchestra. He made his Bayreuth Festival debut in 2010 as Lohengrin returning in the title role of Parsifal in 2011. The same year, O'Neill made his role debut as Walter von Stolzing in Die Meistersinger von Nürnberg at Covent Garden.

Other major engagements have included: the title roles of Parsifal, Lohengrin at the Royal Opera House with Sir Antonio Pappano, Otello, Fidelio, Götterdämmerung and Lohengrin at Houston Grand Opera, the title role in Verdi's Otello and Sergei in his Opera Australia debut in Lady Macbeth of Mtsensk, Florestan with Daniel Barenboim at the BBC Proms with the West-Eastern Divan Orchestra, Gurrelieder with Sir Simon Rattle in Munich and Alan Gilbert at the Elbphilharmonie, and made his Carnegie Hall debut as Caesar in Samuel Barber's Antony and Cleopatra for New York City Opera, returning with the Metropolitan Opera Orchestra and James Levine for Mahler's Das Lied von der Erde and in Beethoven's Missa solemnis with the Boston Symphony.

== Wagnerian repertoire milestone ==
He has achieved the rare distinction of performing every principal Wagnerian Heldentenor role in the standard repertoire. These include:

- Tristan – Tristan und Isolde - Hamburgische Staatsoper
- Siegmund – Die Walküre - Metropolitan Opera
- Siegfried – Siegfried - Bavarian Radio Symphony Orchestra
- Siegfried - Götterdämmerung - Houston Grand Opera
- Tannhäuser – Tannhäuser - Nikikai Opera, Tokyo
- Parsifal – Parsifal - Bayreuth Festival
- Lohengrin – Lohengrin - Bayreuth Festival
- Walther von Stolzing – Die Meistersinger von Nürnberg - Royal Opera House
- Erik – Der fliegende Holländer - Chicago Symphony
- Froh – Das Rheingold - Berlin Staatsoper
- Loge – Das Rheingold - Paris Opera

This milestone places O’Neill among a select group of tenors capable of meeting the vocal and dramatic demands of Warner's work.

== Recordings and awards ==
O'Neill appears as tenor soloist and Dr Marianus to the Deutsche Grammophon recording of Mahler's "Symphony No.8" with the Los Angeles Philharmonic conducted by Gustavo Dudamel. The recording received two nominations for the 2022 Grammy Awards for Best Choral Performance and Best Engineered Album in Classical. It won the Best Choral Performance Award. The album received two nominations at the 2022 Grammy Awards (Best Choral Performance and Best Engineered Album, Classical) and won the award for Best Choral Performance.

== Honours and patronage ==
He serves as patron of the; Wagner Society of New Zealand, having succeeded his teacher, the late Sir Donald McIntyre, the New Zealand Association of Teachers of Singing (Newzats), The New Zealand Opera School, the New Zealand Singing School, New Zealand Circle 100, the New Zealand Brass Foundation, St Kilda Brass, the New Zealand Secondary Students Choir, the Auckland Boys' Choir, Harbour Voices, the Ashburton MSA Choir and the UK Singingworks. He appears on the 1998 New Zealand one-dollar performing arts postage stamp.

In the 2017 Queen's Birthday Honours, O'Neill was appointed an Officer of the New Zealand Order of Merit for services to opera.

== Recordings ==
- Janacek: Káťa Kabanová (LSO Live) London Symphony Orchestra, Simon Rattle
- Wagner: Siegfried (BR-Klassik) Bavarian Radio Symphony Orchestra, Simon Rattle
- Distant Beloved Beethoven Schumann Strauss Wagner (Decca) Terence Dennis, piano
- Mahler: Symphony No. 8 (Deutsche Grammophon) Los Angeles Philharmonic, Gustavo Dudamel
- Wagner: Wagnermania (NoMadMusic) Orchestre national d'Île-de-France, Case Scaglione
- Mahler: Symphony No. 8 Munich Philharmonic, Valery Gergiev
- Father and Son - Wagner Scenes and Arias (EMI) New Zealand Symphony Orchestra, Pietari Inkinen
- Wagner: Siegfried (Halle) The Hallé, Mark Elder
- Wagner: Siegfried (Naxos) Hong Kong Philharmonic, Jaap van Zweden
- Wagner: Der Ring des Nibelungen (opera)| Highlights]] (Naxos) Hong Kong Philharmonic, Jaap van Zweden
- Wagner: Parsifal (Opus Arte) The Royal Opera Covent Garden, Sir Antonio Pappano
- Wagner: Die Walküre (Arthaus Musik) Der Ring des Nibelungen Teatro alla Scala, Daniel Barenboim
- Verdi: Otello (LSO Live) London Symphony Orchestra, Sir Colin Davis
- Weber: Der Freischütz (LSO Live) London Symphony Orchestra, Sir Colin Davis
- Mahler: Symphony No. 8 (Phantom) Sydney Symphony, Vladimir Ashkenazy
- Beethoven: Symphony No. 9 Sony, Die Deutsche Kammerphilharmonie Bremen, Paavo Järvi
- Beethoven: Symphony No. 9 Analekta, Montreal Symphony Orchestra, Kent Nagano
- Martin: Der Sturm Hyperion Records (Netherlands Radio Philharmonic Orchestra), Thierry Fisher
- Mozart: The Magic Flute (Decca) Salzburg Festival, Riccardo Muti
- Chausson: Le roi Arthus (Telarc) BBC Symphony Orchestra, Leon Botstein
- Kiri and Friends (EMI) Auckland Philharmonia

== Awards ==
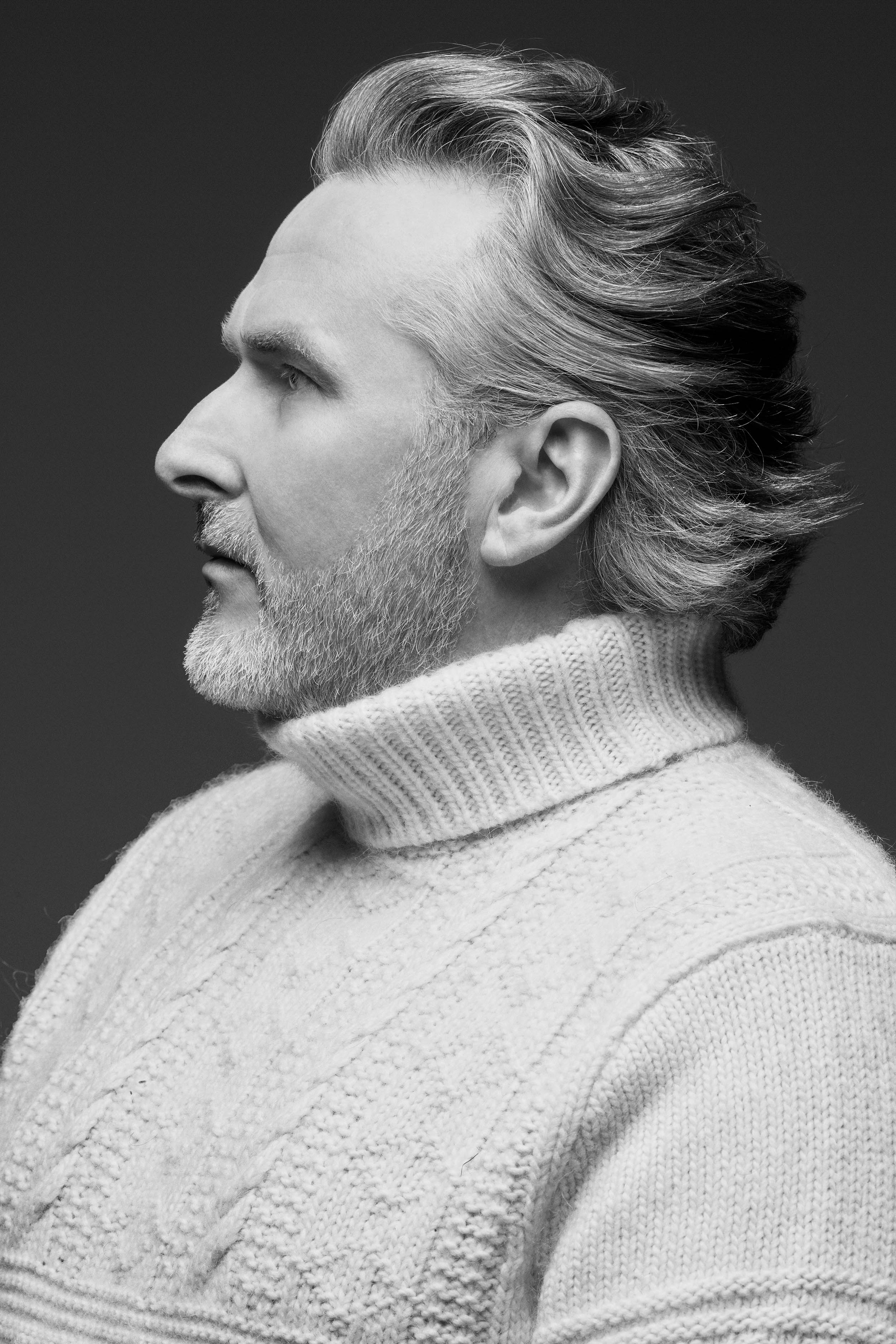
Simon ONeill Wikipedia

- 2017 Officer of the New Zealand Order of Merit Queen's Birthday Honours List
- 2016 Doctor of Music (Honoris Causa) Victoria University of Wellington
- 2005 Arts Foundation of New Zealand Laureate Award
- Grand finalist in the 2002 Metropolitan Opera National Council Auditions
- 2003 United Kingdom Wagner Society Prize
- 2000 Master of Music Manhattan School of Music
- 1999 Metropolitan Opera National Council Auditions Encouragement Award
- 1998 Fulbright Scholarship
- 1995 Bachelor of Music with Honours Victoria University of Wellington
- 1994 Bachelor of Music University of Otago

== Links ==
- "Simon O'Neill". Askonas Holt.
- "Simon O'Neill". Royal Opera House.
- "Simon O'Neill". Bayreuth Festival.
- "Simon O'Neill". San Francisco Opera.

== Sources ==
- "Tenors in training", nysun.com
- Jackson, Nancy Beth (17 January 2002). "Mastering a New Instrument: The Web". The New York Times.
- Profile, newyorker.com
- Profile, iht.com
- Profile, artsfoundation.org.nz
- Profile, stuff.co.nz
