= Rose Pere =

Māori spiritual leader (1937–2020)

- Born: 25 July 1937; Ruatahuna, Bay of Plenty
- Died: 13 December 2020 (aged 83); Waikaremoana, New Zealand
- Resting place: Rongopai Marae
- Known for: education, Māori language advocate, mātauranga Māori, conservationist

Rangimārie Te Turuki Arikirangi Rose Pere CBE (25 July 1937 – 13 December 2020) was a New Zealand educationalist, spiritual leader, Māori language advocate, academic and conservationist. Of Māori descent, she affiliated with the iwi Ngāi Tūhoe, Ngāti Ruapani and Ngāti Kahungunu. Her influences spread throughout New Zealand in education and well-being and she was renowned on the international stage as an expert in indigenous knowledge.

== Biography ==
Pere was born in Ruatahuna in the Bay of Plenty on 25 July 1937. For her first seven years she lived with her maternal grandparents southeast of Waikaremoana. From 1944 she attended Kokako Native School. Between 1956 and 1957 she went to Wellington Teachers' College and obtained a New Zealand Teacher's Certificate. For 33 years she worked in education including as a teacher and as a schools inspector for the Ministry of Education. She initiated total-immersion classes for children after they had come out of kōhanga reo (Māori language immersion pre-school). Her educational influence included nursing "with holistic ways of looking at health".

Pere represented New Zealand in 1975 at the United Nations International Women's Year Conference in Mexico City. In the 1980s and 1990s Pere published books and curriculum. Her books Ako and Te Wheke have had lasting impact. In later years Pere worked with many people sharing her knowledge about plants, living with nature, and healing.

A well-known saying of Pere's is: "He atua, he tangata. We are both beautifully divine and beautifully human."

== Honours and awards ==
In 1972, Pere was named as Young Maori Woman of the Year. She was honoured by the Cherokee Nation in 1984 as White Eagle Medicine Woman Of Peace, and in 1990 she received the New Zealand 1990 Commemoration Medal for her contribution to New Zealand education.

In the 1996 New Year Honours, Pere was appointed a Commander of the Order of the British Empire, for services to Māori education. Later in 1996, she was conferred with an honorary doctorate in literature by Victoria University of Wellington.

== Death ==
Pere died peacefully at her home in Waikaremoana on 13 December 2020. She was buried next to her husband Joseph Pere at Rongopai Marae, near Gisborne. Her three-day tangi across three marae from Wairoa to Tūranga-Nui-a-Kiwa (Gisborne) was covered on national television by the Māori TV news programme, Te Ao.

== Legacy ==
Composer Robert Wiremu wrote Te Kai a Te Rangatira which set to music speeches by several Māori leaders including Pere. Written for baritone and chamber ensemble it was commissioned for the IO Festival Kaitaia.

== Selected works ==
- Ako: Concepts and learning in the Maori tradition (1982) University of Waikato, Dept. of Sociology
- Oxford Maori picture dictionary = He pukapuka kupuāhua Maori, University of Waikato, co-author Peter Cleave. Dept. of Sociology. 4 editions published between 1978 and 1997 in English. Picture dictionary which illustrates over 3,000 Maori words
- Te wheke : a celebration of infinite wisdom, C. Gunderson. 8 editions published between 1991 and 2009 in English
- Te Whariki : he whariki matauranga mo nga mokopuna o Aotearoa = national early childhood curriculum guidelines in New Zealand (1992) Tamati Reedy; Tilly Reedy; Tuki Nepe; Rangimarie Rose Pere; Vapi Kupenga;
- The Te Kohanga Reo National Trust : review of trust operations
