= Ricky Houghton =

New Zealand Māori advocate (1960–2022)

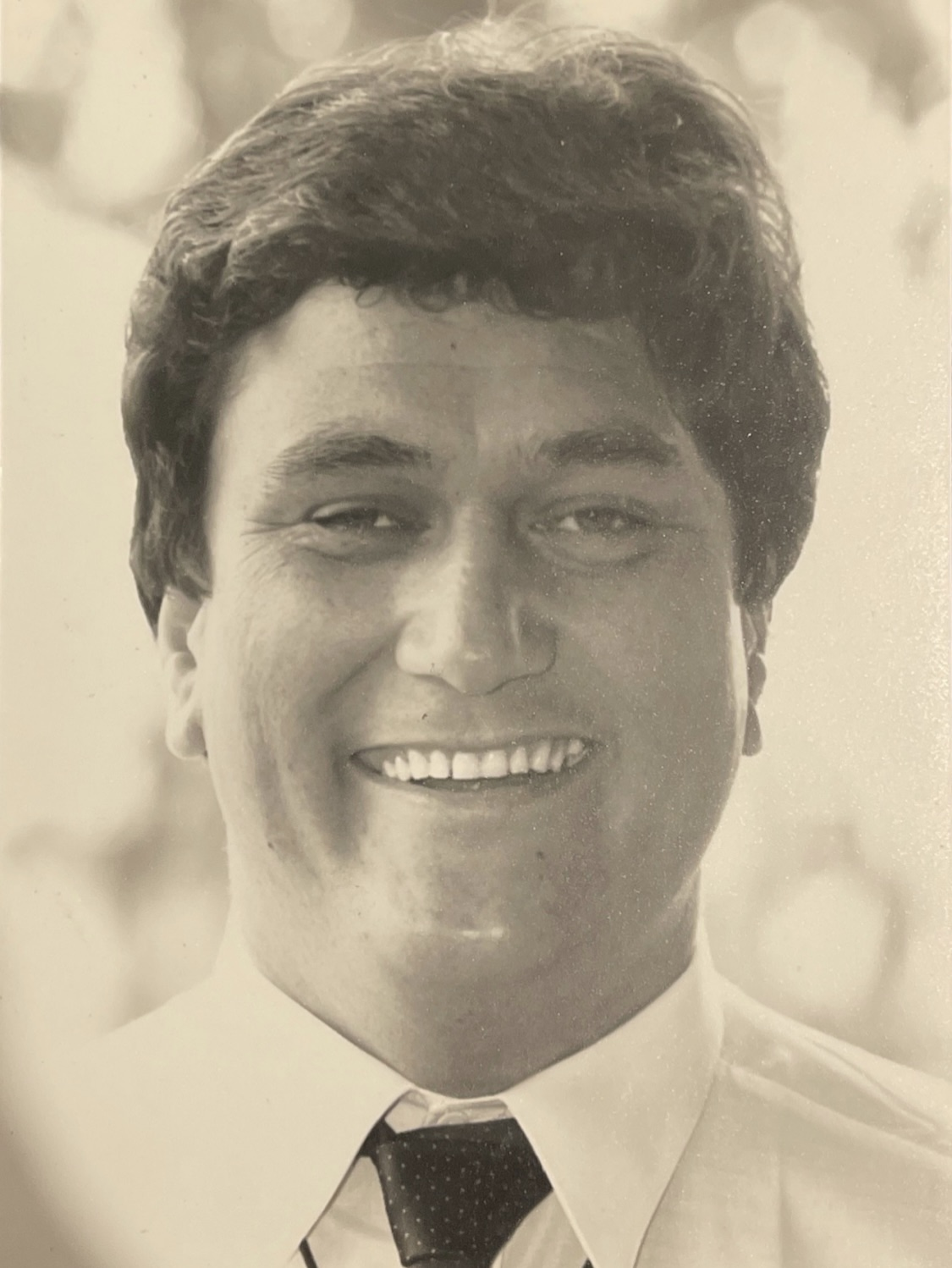
Houghton in the 1980s

Ricky Martin Houghton (7 April 1960 – 18 July 2022) was a Māori rangatira, entrepreneur, businessman and social service advocate.

He is known for his contributions towards the development of Māori in the social service sector, and his pioneering of the housing space. Houghton was a founder and chief executive officer of He Korowai Trust, a two-decade long trustee for Waipareira Trust, and one of the three founders of Te Piringatahi o te Maungarongo Marae.

Houghton was the recipient of the 2018 Kiwibank New Zealander of the Year Local Hero Award and the 2019 University of Auckland Outstanding Māori Business Leader Award. He was posthumously awarded the Te Kura a Tāne award at the 2023 National Māori Housing Conference in Rotorua.

== Biography ==
Houghton was born 7 April 1960 to an English father, Gilbert-Benjamin Houghton, and a Māori mother, Tukino Kay Latimer, in Auckland, New Zealand. His iwi affiliations were to Ngāti Kahu and Ngāpuhi. He was put into state care and was a ward of the state between 1968 and 1972. He was put into care homes around the country, most notably Lake Alice Hospital and Oakley Hospital, and was subject to abuse whilst in care. Houghton was a nephew to Graham Latimer, and spent a portion of his youth living with his uncle in Tinopai following his departure from state care via the Matua Whāngai programme.

After Houghton returned to Auckland, he met his wife, Moengaroa Rosie Houghton (née Peeni), whilst attending Rangeview Intermediate School. Rosie Houghton is of Māori descent and is affiliated with the iwi of Ngāti Hine and Ngāpuhi; she is a descendant of Kupe-Nuku, Nukutawhiti, Rāhiri, Hineamaru and Te Ruki Kawiti. The couple settled in Massey, West Auckland, in 1979, and had three children. Ricky Houghton died of cancer on 18 July 2022, in Auckland.

== Career ==
Houghton was known for his staunch advocacy for the wellbeing of Māori; he carried decades' worth of experience working with communities and held a number of certificates with the Institute of Directors and New Zealand College of Management.

Houghton sought to improve the quality of life for Māori families in the Auckland and Muriwhenua regions. Through his works with Waipareira Trust, Houghton developed a deep understanding of the social needs of Māori and then took his skills to Northland, where he founded He Korowai Trust, based in Kaitaia, on 17 October 2001.

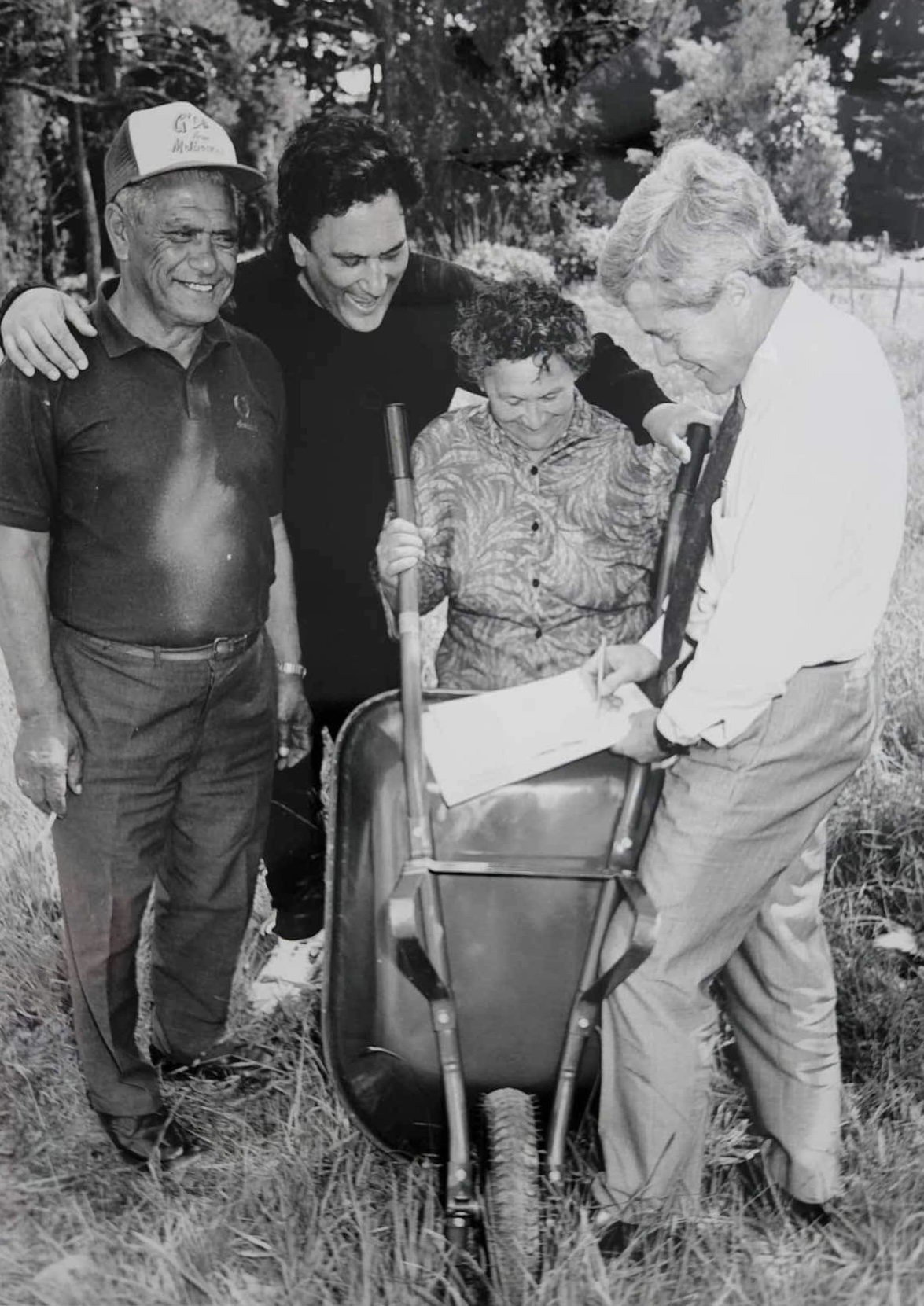
Houghton (second from left) standing with, Ngakuru Peeni, Toti Peeni, and Jack Bradlaugh Luckens, 1987

He Korowai Trust was founded based on developing Tino rangatiratanga. Through the trust, Houghton helped hundreds of families find homes in Northland. He later developed a housing strategy that merged Māori and mainstream philosophies to house families on Māori land.

== Te Piringatahi o te Maungarongo Marae ==
During the mid and late 1980s, there were talks amongst the Waitākere Māori community about the possibility of the opening of another urban marae in West Auckland following the opening of Hoani Waititi Marae in 1980. Houghton was a main advocate for the idea and spearheaded the approach, eventually leading to the development of Te Piringatahi o Te Maungarongo Marae, which opened on 30 October 1992. According to John Tamihere, Houghton "was instrumental in raising the resources and consent for Te Piringatahi o te Maungarongo Marae in Massey, West Auckland".

Houghton was one of the three founders of Te Piringatahi Marae; the other two founders being his wife's parents, Ngakuru John Peeni and Toti Celia Peeni (née Shortland), who were both of Ngāti Hine, Te Orewai descent.

== Legacy ==
Composer Robert Wiremu wrote Te Kai a Te Rangatira which set to music speeches by several Māori leaders including Houghton. Written for baritone and chamber ensemble it was commissioned for the IO Festival Kaitaia.
