= Thierry Fischer =

Swiss orchestra conductor and flutist

Thierry Fischer (born 28 September 1957) is an orchestra conductor and flutist. He is currently residing in Switzerland.

== Early life and education ==
Fischer was born in the Federation of Rhodesia and Nyasaland (Zambia) to Swiss parents. He studied flute^{where?} with Aurèle Nicolet and began his musical career as Principal Flute in Hamburg and at the Zurich Opera, where he studied scores with Nikolaus Harnoncourt.

== Career ==
Fischer’s most recent elongated tenure as music director at Utah Symphony Utah Opera concluded in 2023 and he is now Conductor Emeritus. In the 2023 fiscal year, Utah Symphony Utah Opera stated on their Form 990 that his compensation for that year was $350,522.

Fischer's conducting career began in his 30s, conducting his first concerts with the Chamber Orchestra of Europe, where he was principal flute under Claudio Abbado.

From 1997 to 2001, Fischer was chief conductor of the Netherlands Ballet Orchestra (Nederlands Balletorkest). In 2001, Fischer became principal conductor of the Ulster Orchestra in Belfast, a role he held until 2006. In September 2006, he became principal conductor of the BBC National Orchestra of Wales (BBC NOW), and concluded his BBC NOW tenure after the 2011-2012 season. During this period, he performed at the BBC Proms every year, and also toured internationally.

Outside of Europe, Fischer was chief conductor of the Nagoya Philharmonic Orchestra from April 2008 through February 2011. He now has the title of Honorary Guest Conductor with the Nagoya Philharmonic. In September 2016, the Seoul Philharmonic Orchestra announced the appointment of Fischer as its principal guest conductor, effective January 2017, with an initial contract of 3 years.

In the USA, Fischer became music director of the Utah Symphony in September 2009, initially with a contract term of 4 years. In February 2012, the Utah Symphony announced the extension of Fischer's initial contract through the 2015-2016 season. In May 2014, the orchestra further extended his contract through the 2018-2019 season. In May 2017, the orchestra announced his most recent Utah contract extension through the 2021-2022 season. In May 2019, the Utah Symphony announced that Fischer is to conclude his tenure as its music director at the end of his current contract, at the close of the 2021-2022 season. However, in October 2020, the Utah Symphony announced a revision to the scheduled conclusion of Fischer's contract as its music director, with a new one-year extension through August 2023, to supersede the May 2019 announcement.

In October 2016, Fischer first guest-conducted the Orquestra Sinfônica do Estado de São Paulo (OSESP). In June 2019, OSESP announced the appointment of Fischer as its next music director, effective in 2020, with an initial contract through 2024, which was extended in 2022 until December 2027. In June 2022 he was announced Music Director of the Orquesta Sinfónica de Castilla y León in Spain, for an initial period of three seasons.^{Present status?}

Fischer has made several recordings, most notably of Swiss composer Frank Martin's orchestral music for Deutsche Grammophon, which was nominated for a Gramophone Award. He has also recorded several CDs for the Hyperion label, including Complete symphonies of Camille Saint Saëns, music of Florent Schmitt and Jean Françaix; he recorded Stravinsky for Signum and Orfeo; and has recorded a disc of music by Beethoven for Aparte. His 2012 recording of Frank Martin’s opera Der Sturm, with the Netherlands Radio Philharmonic Orchestra and Chorus, received the International Classical Music Award. He has also recorded Mahler's Symphony No. 1 and Symphony No. 8 with the Utah Symphony and the Mormon Tabernacle Choir on Reference Records.

== Personal life ==
Fischer and his wife have three children, and live in Switzerland.

== Selected recordings ==
- Rare French Works for Violin and Orchestra, Gabriel Fauré, Violin Concerto in D minor op.14, Camille Saint-Saëns, Morceau de Concert Op.62, Édouard Lalo, Fantaisie Norvégienne, Guitare Op.28, Joseph Canteloube, Poème, Ernest Guiraud, Caprice, Philippe Graffin, violon, The Ulster Orchestra conducted by Thierry Fisher. CD Hyperion 2001
- Camille Saint-Saëns, Symphony n°1 in E flat major Op.2, Symphony in A major, Le Carnaval des Animaux, Utah Symphony, conducted by Thierry Fisher. CD Hyperion 2019
- Camille Saint-Saëns, Symphony in F major “Urbs Roma”, Symphony n°2 op.55, La Danse macabre Op.40, Utah Symphony, conducted by Thierry Fisher. CD Hyperion 2019
- Camille Saint-Saëns, La Foi, 3 Tableaux symphoniques Op.130, Symphony n°3 in C minor Op.78, Paul Jacobs, organ, Utah Symphony, conducted by Thierry Fisher. CD Hyperion 2018

Cultural offices
Preceded by Roelof van Driesten	Netherlands Ballet Orchestra, Chief Conductor; 1997–2001	Succeeded by Jeppe Moulijn
Preceded by Dmitry Sitkovetsky	Principal Conductor, Ulster Orchestra; 2001–2006	Succeeded by Kenneth Montgomery
Preceded by Richard Hickox	Principal Conductor, BBC National Orchestra of Wales; 2006–2012	Succeeded by Thomas Søndergård
Preceded by Ryusuke Numajiri	Chief Conductor, Nagoya Philharmonic Orchestra; 2008–2011	Succeeded by Martyn Brabbins
Preceded by Marin Alsop	Principal Conductor, São Paulo State Symphony Orchestra; 2020–present	Succeeded by incumbent
