= Der Sturm (opera) =

- Opera by Frank Martin
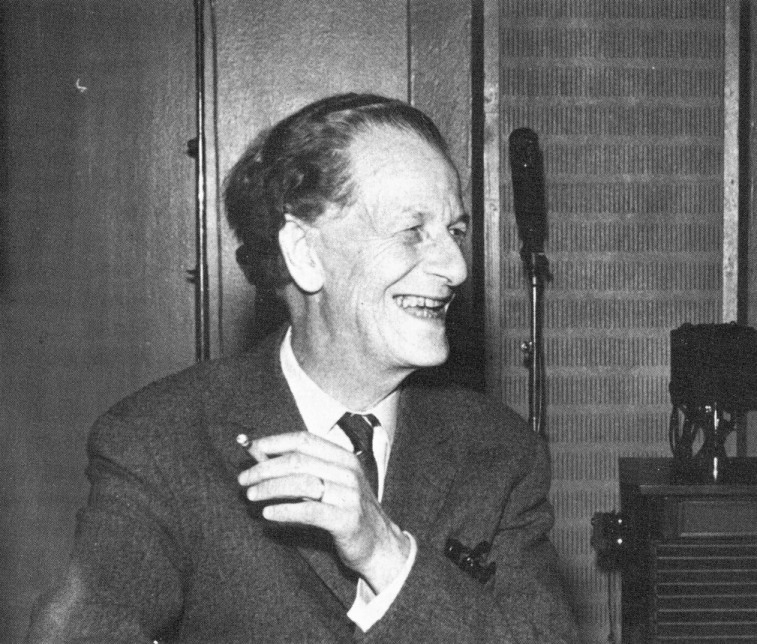
- Frank Martin in 1960
- Language: German
- Based on: Shakespeare's The Tempest
- Premiere: 17 June 1956; Vienna State Opera

Der Sturm (The Tempest) is a German-language opera in three acts and an epilogue by the Swiss composer Frank Martin to a libretto based on the Schlegel/Tieck German translation of Shakespeare's The Tempest.

Martin's only opera was premiered at the Vienna State Opera on 17 June 1956. The role of Prospero was conceived for Dietrich Fischer-Dieskau, but illness prevented him from participating. Casaglia lists Fischer-Dieskau in the role of Sebastian, but a playbill for the premiere lists Ljubomir Pantscheff in that role.

The word setting is through-composed parlando, with few set pieces, most of which belong to Prospero.

== Roles ==
Roles, voice types, premiere cast
Role	Voice type	Premiere cast, 17 June 1956 Conductor: Ernest Ansermet
Prospero	bass	Eberhard Wächter
Miranda	soprano	Christa Ludwig
Alonso	bass	Frederick Guthrie
Sebastian	baritone	(see note above)
Antonio	tenor	László Szemere
Gonzalo	bass	Frederick Guthrie
Ferdinand	tenor	Anton Dermota
Adrian	tenor	Murray Dickie
Caliban	bass	Endré Koréh
Trinculo	tenor	Anton Dermota
Stephano	baritone	Karl Dönch
Sailor	baritone	Viktor Madin
Ariel	dancer	Willy Dirtl
Iris, Ceres, Juno, Nymphs, Reapers		ballet
Sailors	male choir	male choir

== Recordings ==
- Extracts: Dietrich Fischer-Dieskau (Prospero), Berlin Philharmonic conducted by the composer, Deutsche Grammophon 1964
- Live recording: Robert Holl as Prospero, Christine Buffle as Miranda, Simon O'Neill as Ferdinand, James Gilchrist as Antonio, Ethan Herschenfeld as Alonso, Netherlands Radio Philharmonic Orchestra and Netherlands Radio Choir, conductor Thierry Fischer, Hyperion 2012. International Classical Music Awards 2012, Gramophone Editor's Choice, Gramophone Critics' Choice 2011, Diapason d'Or
