= New Zealand Secondary Students' Choir =

The New Zealand Secondary Students' Choir (NZSSC) is a national choir of New Zealand that consists of around 50 singers selected from full-time secondary school students every two years. Between auditions, each new choir meets around six times to learn new repertoire, tour both urban and rural parts of New Zealand, provide choral workshops for schools and tour internationally. The choir has received international attention and critical acclaim from overseas audiences but limited publicity in New Zealand itself. Their repertoire, although widely varied in style, age and language, specifically emphasises works by New Zealand composers and music from Māori and other Polynesian cultures. Performances by the choir regularly include commissioned works showcasing these uniquely New Zealand traditions.

== History ==
The New Zealand Secondary Students' Choir roots started in a choral course for secondary school students in the 1960s with the first performance as a choir of its kind in 1967 under the musical direction of Malcolm Rickard. The choir was formalised and named in 1986 by Dr Guy Jansen primarily as a training ground for the (formerly) New Zealand National Youth Choir however, two years later, Roger Stevenson took musical directorship, turning the choir into a separate entity with the New Zealand Secondary Students' Choir becoming a charitable trust in 1997. Late in 2000, the choir appointed Elise Bradley as Musical Director. For each NZSSC that she directed, Elise Bradley appointed a professional tutoring team to assist her and also took on conducting trainees, most notably of whom was Andrew Withington who would become musical director of the choir in 2009. The appointment of tutors by the musical director has since continued, contributing greatly to the unique nature of each new choir.

In 2004, the choir performed in the Oregon Bach Festival in Eugene, Oregon, USA. The NZSSC then toured Canada, taking three first-place awards (Mixed Voice Youth Choir, Youth Choir and Folk & Cultural Traditions) at the International Choral Kathaumixw in Powell River. In this, the 11th biennial competition, the NZSSC earned more awards than any other choir in any year of competition over the history of the competition; a record which still stands. The 2005–2006 choir competed in the Hong Kong International Youth & Children's Choir Festival where it took the top award, "The World’s Choir" title and directly following this the choir travelled to Xiamen, China where it competed in the World Choir Games, gaining a Gold Award and Champion in the Mixed Youth Choir category and a Silver Award in the Folklore a cappella category. Elise Bradley resigned as musical director of the NZSSC in the beginning of 2007 in order to take up the position of Artistic Director of the Toronto Children's Chorus. As a past member and long-standing tutor of the choir, Robert Wiremu agreed to take on a temporary position as the musical director in late 2007 and led their successful participation in a non-competitive South American festival tour. In 2009, Andrew Withington was appointed as the musical director of the NZSSC. Following Withington's departure in 2018, Sue Densem was appointed music director of the NZSSC 2019.

== Awards (incomplete) ==
Year	Competition	Category	Award	Location
2004	11th International Choral Kathaumixw	Mixed Choir	First Place	Powell River, Canada
2004	11th International Choral Kathaumixw	Youth Choir	First Place	Powell River, Canada
2004	11th International Choral Kathaumixw	Folk & Cultural Traditions	First Place	Powell River, Canada
2006	Hong Kong International Youth & Children's Choir Festival	Grand Prize	"The World’s Choir"	Hong Kong
2006	Hong Kong International Youth & Children's Choir Festival	Youth Choir SATB	Gold A (Winner)	Hong Kong
2006	Hong Kong International Youth & Children's Choir Festival	Folklore	Gold B (Shared Winner)	Hong Kong
2006	4th World Choir Games	Mixed Youth Choir	Gold (Champion)	Xiamen, China
2006	4th World Choir Games	Folklore a cappella	Silver	Xiamen, China

== Discography (incomplete) ==
=== Albums ===
- 1993/94 New Zealand Secondary Students' Choir (1994)
- Sing We Triumphant (1999)
- Pastime with Plums and Pizzazz (2002)
- Whisper You All the Way Home (2004)
- 2005/06 New Zealand Secondary Students' Choir: Choral Champions (2006)
- New Zealand Secondary Students' Choir – On Tour 2008 (2008)
- NZ Secondary Students' Choir 2009/2010 In Concert
- World on a String: A Choral Celebration (2014)

=== DVDs ===
- Biennial Recordings for Praise Be

== See also ==
- New Zealand Youth Choir
- Voices New Zealand Chamber Choir
