= New Zealand Youth Choir =

Mixed choir

The New Zealand Youth Choir is a mixed choir consisting of around 50 singers, auditioned nationally every 3 years from around New Zealand. The choir accepts members aged between 18 and 25 at the time of audition, and places will generally be offered for three years.

The choir was formed in 1979 by Guy Jansen and has subsequently been conducted by Professor Peter Godfrey (1980 to 1988), Dr Karen Grylls (1989 to 2010) and David Squire (2011 to 2025). Former choir member Rowan Johnston was appointed music director in August 2025. In 2019 the choir joined forces with the New Zealand Youth Orchestra and Voices New Zealand to celebrate its 40th anniversary.

The choir is governed by the Choirs Aotearoa New Zealand Trust, which also governs Voices New Zealand Chamber Choir, the NZYC Alumni Choir and the New Zealand Secondary Students' Choir. The Chief Executive of the Trust is Arne Herrmann, who has held this position since mid 2016.

== International tours and awards ==
The choir has achieved considerable success both within New Zealand and internationally, including winning the Let the Peoples Sing competition in 1992, the 'Choir of the World' title at the Llangollen International Musical Eisteddfod in 1999, and the 'Grand Prix Slovakia' in the same year. The choir toured Europe in 2004.

In 2010 the choir toured Singapore, Seoul, Shanghai (where it performed as part of Expo 2010), Brisbane, Canberra, and Sydney. The final concert for the tour was broadcast live on ABC Classic FM and Radio New Zealand Concert.

At the end of 2013 the choir toured to Los Angeles (where it participated in a performance of Benjamin Britten's War Requiem at the Walt Disney Concert Hall), Toronto, Ottawa, Montreal, Boston, New York and Washington DC.

During its 2016 European Landmark Tour, NZYC won the GRAND PRIX at the 2016 International Festival of Academic Choirs in Pardubice Czech Republic and also all four categories it competed in. It also performed at Windsor Castle, Cambridge Summer Music Festival, Ely Cathedral, Oxford, Notre Dame de Paris, and Le Quesnoy.

In 2025 the choir won the Grand Prix of Nations at the European Choir Games in Denmark and was again awarded Choir of the World at the Llangollen International Musical Eisteddfod in Wales.

== Alumni ==
Notable former members of the choir include: conductor Tecwyn Evans, soprano Anna Leese, bass baritone Jonathan Lemalu, tenor Simon O'Neill, soprano Madeleine Pierard, baritone Teddy Tahu Rhodes, bass Martin Snell, all three members of Sol3 Mio, baritone in the King's Singers Chris Bruerton, journalist Hilary Barry, Labour MP Rachel Boyack and composers Igelese Ete, David Hamilton, Anthony Ritchie and Glenda Keam.

== Discography ==
Album title	Year released	Conductor	Choir performing as	Link to track listing and audio sample
National Youth Choir of New Zealand in Concert	1981	Guy Jansen and David Wilcocks	National Youth Choir of New Zealand	
National Youth Choir of New Zealand on Tour	1983	Peter Godfrey	National Youth Choir of New Zealand	
Peter Godfrey conducts the National Youth Choir of New Zealand	1984	Peter Godfrey	National Youth Choir of New Zealand	
New Zealand Youth Sings to the World	1987	Peter Godfrey	National Youth Choir of New Zealand	
Te Roopu Rangatahi Waiata o Aotearoa	1992	Karen Grylls	New Zealand National Youth Choir	
Winds that Whisper	1999	Karen Grylls	Tower New Zealand Youth Choir	http://www.choirsnz.co.nz/cd/winds-that-whisper
Choir of the World: Live from Llangollen and London	1999	Karen Grylls	Tower New Zealand Youth Choir	
Gaude	2004	Karen Grylls	Tower New Zealand Youth Choir	http://www.choirsnz.co.nz/gaude
Deep River	2013	David Squire	New Zealand Youth Choir	
NZYC: Live in London	2016	David Squire	New Zealand Youth Choir	http://www.choirsnz.co.nz/cd/nzyc-live-in-london
Hokorua : New Zealand Youth Choir 40 years 1979-2019	2019	David Squire	New Zealand Youth Choir	
