= Karen Grylls =

New Zealand choral conductor and academic

Karen Grylls CNZM
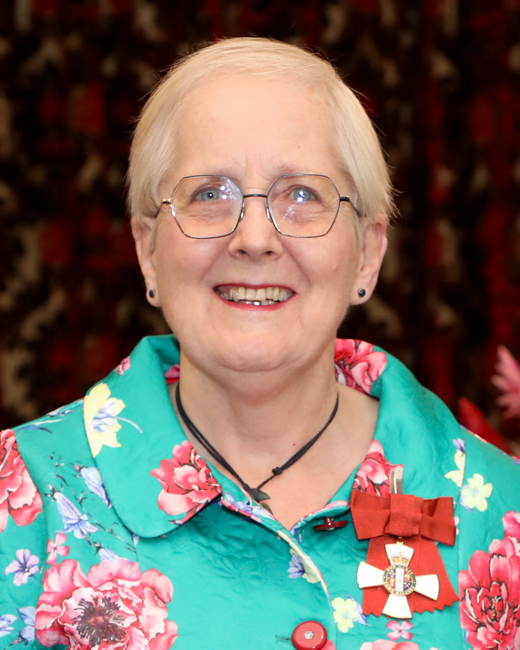
- Grylls in 2023
- Born: Karen Lesley Grylls; 9 July 1951 (age 75); Pahiatua, New Zealand
- Occupations: Choral conductor; academic

Academic background
- Education: University of Washington
- Thesis: The aggregate re-ordered: a paradigm for Stravinsky's Requiem canticles (1993)

Academic work
- Discipline: Music
- Sub-discipline: Choral conducting
- Institutions: University of Auckland

Karen Lesley Grylls CNZM (born 9 July 1951) is a New Zealand choral conductor. She is an associate professor in choral conducting at the University of Auckland and founder of Voices New Zealand Chamber Choir.

== Early life and education ==
Grylls was born in Pahiatua on 9 July 1951. As her father worked for the Post Office, the family moved around the country during her childhood. She was educated at Napier Girls' High School, Hokitika High School, and Central Southland College, where she was dux in 1968.

Grylls completed Bachelor of Arts and Bachelor of Music degrees at the University of Otago in 1973, followed by a Diploma of Teaching from Christchurch Teachers College in 1974. In 1980, she gained a Master of Music degree at the University of Auckland. She then gained a Master of Music in choral conducting in 1983 and a PhD in 1993, both from the University of Washington in Seattle. The title of her doctoral thesis was The aggregate re-ordered: a paradigm for Stravinsky's Requiem canticles.

== Career ==
From 1989 to 2011, Grylls conducted the New Zealand Youth Choir. In 1992, the Youth Choir won the Silver Rose Bowl award at the international choral competition Let the Peoples Sing. She founded the Voices New Zealand Chamber Choir in 1998. In 2011, she became artistic director of Toronto's Exultate Chamber Choir for two years. Since 1986, Grylls has been a lecturer in music at the University of Auckland, rising to become an associate professor in 2000.

Grylls has been a judge at numerous international choral competitions and festivals.

== Honours and awards ==
In the 1999 New Year Honours, Grylls was appointed an Officer of the New Zealand Order of Merit, for services to choral music. She received an Auckland University Distinguished Teaching Award in music in 1996 for excellence in teaching. In 2006, she received a KBB Citation for Services to New Zealand Music from the Composers Association of New Zealand.

In the 2023 King's Birthday and Coronation Honours, Grylls was promoted to Companion of the New Zealand Order of Merit, for services to choral music.

== Selected works ==
- Grylls, K. (2012). "Voices of the Pacific: The (ch)oral traditions of Oceania". In De Quadros, A. (ed.). The Cambridge Companion to Choral Music. Cambridge University Press. pp. 177–184. doi:10.1017/CCOL9780521111737.014. ISBN 9780521111737.
