= Frank Martin (composer) =

Swiss composer (1890–1974)

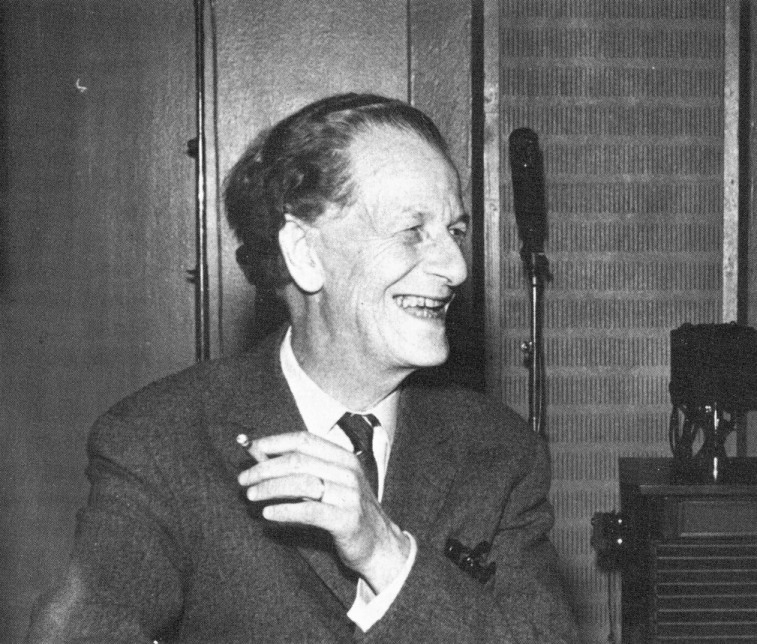
- Martin during his visit to Helsinki, 1960
- Born: 15 September 1890; Geneva, Switzerland
- Died: 21 November 1974 (aged 84); Naarden, Netherlands
- Education: Geneva University
- Occupations: Composer; Academic teacher
- Organizations: Jaques-Dalcroze Institute; Geneva Conservatory

Frank Théodore Martin (15 September 1890 – 21 November 1974) was a Swiss composer who spent much of his life in the Netherlands.

== Childhood and youth ==
Born into a Huguenot family in the Eaux-Vives quarter of Geneva, the youngest of the ten children of a Calvinist pastor named Charles Martin, Frank Martin started to improvise on the piano prior to his formal schooling. At the age of nine he had already written a few songs, without external musical instruction. At age 12, he attended a performance of Bach's St Matthew Passion and was deeply affected by it.

Respecting his parents' wishes, he studied mathematics and physics for two years at Geneva University, but at the same time was also studying piano, composition and harmony with his first music teacher Joseph Lauber (1864–1953), a Geneva composer and by that time a leading figure of the city's musical scene. In the 1920s, Martin worked closely with Émile Jaques-Dalcroze from whom he learned much about rhythm and musical theory. Between 1918 and 1926 Martin lived in Zürich, Rome and Paris. Compositions of this time show him searching for an authentic musical voice of his own.

In 1926 he established the Chamber Music Society of Geneva, which for the next ten years he conducted, as well as contributing on the clavichord and piano. During this period he also taught music theory and improvisation at the Jaques-Dalcroze Institute, and chamber music at the Geneva Conservatory.

== Works ==
Martin's music was often inspired by his Christianity. In this regard, his compositions stemmed from "the individuality rather than universality of his faith ... certainly broader than Calvinism".

The Petite symphonie concertante of 1944–45 made Martin's international reputation, and is the best known of his orchestral works, as the early Mass is the best known of his choral compositions, and the Jedermann monologues for baritone and piano or orchestra the best known of his works for solo voice. Other Martin pieces include a full-scale symphony (1936–37), two piano concertos, a harpsichord concerto, a violin concerto, a cello concerto, a concerto for seven wind instruments, and a series of six one-movement works he called "ballades" for various solo instruments with piano or orchestra.

Among a dozen major scores for the theater are operatic settings of Shakespeare's Der Sturm (The Tempest) in August Wilhelm Schlegel's German version (1952–55) and of Molière's Monsieur de Pourceaugnac (1960–62), and the satirical fairy tale La Nique à Satan (Thumbing Your Nose at Satan; 1928–31). His works on sacred texts and subjects include the large-scale theater piece Le Mystère de la Nativité (The Mystery of the Nativity; 1957/1959) and are widely considered among the finest religious compositions of the 20th century. Swiss musician Ernest Ansermet, a champion of his music from 1918 onwards, recorded many of Martin's works, including the oratorio In Terra Pax (1944), with the Orchestre de la Suisse Romande.

Martin based his mature style on his personal variant (first used around 1932) of Arnold Schoenberg's twelve-tone technique, but he did not abandon tonality. Lean textures and habitual rhythmic vehemence distinguish his style from Schoenberg's. Some of Martin's most acclaimed music comes from his last decade. He worked on his last cantata, Et la vie l'emporta, until ten days before his death. Frank Martin died on November 21, 1974, in Naarden. The funeral service was held on December 6 at St. Pierre Cathedral in Geneva. He is buried in Plainpalais Cimetière des Rois.

Martin's music is widely performed in continental Europe, and to a much lesser extent, in the United Kingdom.

== Principal works ==
=== Orchestra ===
- Esquisse for orchestra (1920)
- Rythmes for orchestra (1926)
- Fox Trot for small orchestra (1927)
- Guitare for orchestra (1934)
- Symphonie for orchestra (1936–37)
- Passacaille for large orchestra (1944/62)
- Symphonie concertante for orchestra (1944–46)
- Études for string orchestra (1955–56)
- Ouverture en hommage à Mozart for orchestra (1956)
- Les quatre éléments for orchestra (1963–64)
- Erasmi monumentum for large orchestra and organ (1969)

=== Concerto ===
- Piano Concerto No. 1 (1933–34)
- Danse de la peur for two pianos and small orchestra (1936)
- Ballade for alto saxophone or basset horn, string orchestra, piano, timpani and percussion (1938)
- Ballade for piano and orchestra (1939)
- Ballade for flute, string orchestra and piano (1939–41)
- Ballade for trombone or tenor saxophone and small orchestra (1940–41)
- Petite symphonie concertante for harp, harpsichord, piano and two string orchestras (1944–45)
- Ballade for violoncello and small orchestra (1949)
- Concerto for seven wind instruments, timpani, percussion, and string orchestra (1949)
- Violin Concerto (1950)
- Concerto for harpsichord and small orchestra (1951–52)
- Cello Concerto (1965)
- Piano Concerto No. 2 (1969)
- Trois danses for oboe, harp, string quintet and string orchestra (1970)
- Ballade for viola, wind orchestra, harpsichord, harp, timpani and percussion (1972)
- Polyptyque, for violin and two small string orchestras (1973)

=== Ballet ===
- Das Märchen vom Aschenbrödel (1941)

=== Chamber ===
- Violin Sonata, No. 1 for string quintet (1913)
- Pavane couleur du temps for string quintet (1920)
- Piano Quintet (1922)
- Trio sur des mélodies populaires irlandaises (1925)
- Violin Sonata No. 2 (1931–32)
- Rhapsodie for two violins, two violas and double bass (1935)
- String Trio (1936)
- Sonata da chiesa for viola d'amore and organ (1938)
- Ballade for trombone or tenor saxophone and piano (1938)
- Ballade for flute and piano (1939)
- Ballade for trombone and piano (1940)
- String Quartet (1967)

=== Guitar ===
- Quatre pièces brèves (1933)
- Drey Minnelieder, for soprano, flute and guitar (1960)

=== Piano ===
- Eight Préludes (1947–48)
- Fantasia on Flamenco Rhythms (1970–73)

=== Organ ===
- Passacaille (1944)
- Agnus Dei pour orgue (1965/66)

=== Choral ===
- Les Dithyrambes for soloists, chorus and orchestra (1918)
- Mass for Double Chorus (1922/26)
- Cantate pour le temps de Noël for soloists, female chorus, boys' chorus, string orchestra, harpsichord and organ (1929–30)
- Cantate pour le 1er août for mixed choir and organ (1941)
- In terra pax, oratorio for soloists, two choirs and orchestra (1944)
- Golgotha, oratorio for soloists, chorus, organ, and orchestra (1945–48)
- Songs of Ariel for chorus a cappella (1950)
- Le Mystère de la Nativité, oratorio for chorus and orchestra (1957–59)
- Pseaumes de Genève for mixed chorus, children's chorus, organ and orchestra (1958)
- Ode à la musique for baritone, mixed choir, 1 trumpet, 2 horns, 3 trombones, double bass and piano (1961)
- Pilate for soloists, chorus and orchestra (1964)
- Requiem for soloists, chorus, orchestra and big organ (1971–72)

=== Vocal ===
- Le Vin herbé, secular oratorio for twelve voices, seven strings and piano (1938/41)
- Die Weise von Liebe und Tod des Cornets Christoph Rilke for alto and small orchestra (1942–43)
- Sechs Monologe aus Jedermann for baritone or alto and orchestra (1943–44)
- Trois chants de Noël (texts by Albert Rudhardt) (1947)
- Suite for baritone and orchestra (1952/55)
- Maria-Triptychon for soprano, violin and orchestra (1967–68)
- Poèmes de la mort for tenor, baritone, bass and three electric guitars (1969–71)
- Et la vie l'emporta for alto, baritone, chamber chorus and chamber ensemble (1974)

=== Opera ===
- Der Sturm (1952–55)
