= Petite symphonie concertante =

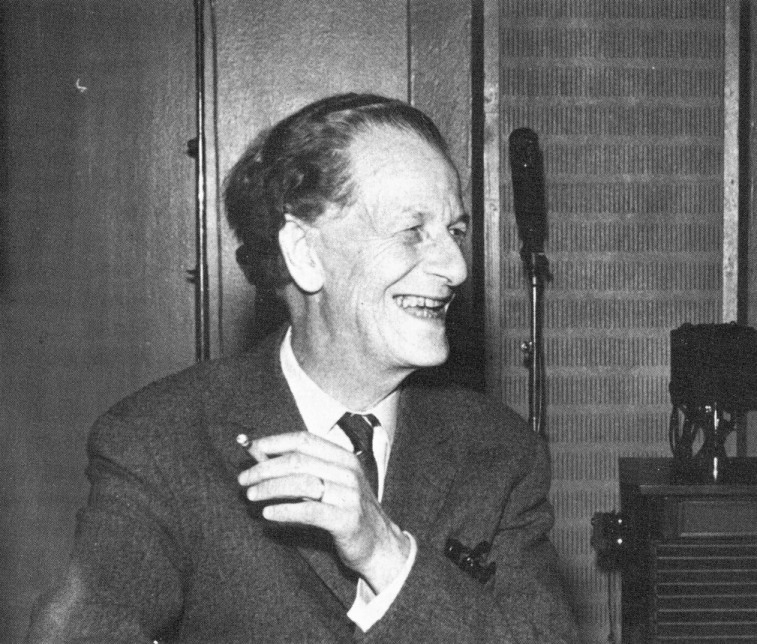
Frank Martin in 1960

Petite symphonie concertante, Op. 54 is a composition by Swiss composer Frank Martin, commissioned in 1944 by its dedicatee, conductor Paul Sacher, and finished in 1945. (Note: Martin was delayed by his work on the oratorio In Terra Pax.) Martin chose an unusual scoring at Sacher's request: string orchestra divided into two groups with harp, harpsichord, piano as soloists rather than continuo, justifying the title (and evoking the fifth of Bach's Brandenburg Concertos). Written for the revival harpsichord, it is an uncommon 20th-century sinfonia concertante.

It has two movements separated by a brief pause. Each has contrasting sections. The first opens with a 46-measure slow introduction generating motives for the Allegro, and the second with an Adagio showcasing the soloists (harp, piano, then harpsichord) before a lively march.

Neoclassical in style, the music reflects Martin's adoration of Bach. It blends Austro-German motivic density and polyphony with French harmonic color and timbral shading, and freer musical form.

A twelve-tone row opens the work and recurs discontinuously alongside other motivic material. Counting fragmentary iterations, it appears in all transpositions but never in retrograde or inversion. As was his habit, Martin often uses it as ostinato accompaniment. He fixes durations and, within transpositions, register. As the work continues, the last note of one transposition sometimes also serves as the first note of the next.

Sacher premiered it in Zurich on May 27, 1946. Martin won international recognition. To facilitate performances, he rescored it for full orchestra without soloists as the Symphonie concertante.

== Selected recordings ==
Original version

- RIAS-Symphonie Orchester, Ferenc Fricsay (Deutsche Grammophon), recorded 1950
- Suisse Romande Orchestra, Ernest Ansermet (Decca), 1951
- Symphony Orchestra, Leopold Stokowski (EMI), 1957
- Suisse Romande Orchestra, composer (Jecklin), 1970
- Academy of St Martin in the Fields, Neville Marriner (EMI), 1978
- NDR-Sinfonie Orchester, Günter Wand (RCA Victor), 1984
- Suisse Romande Orchestra, Armin Jordan (Erato), 1991

Rescored version

- London Philharmonic Orchestra, Matthias Bamert (Chandos), 1993
