= Voices New Zealand Chamber Choir =

Voices New Zealand Chamber Choir was formed in 1998.

It is a semi-professional mixed chamber choir consisting of a core of 16 to 24 members with additional singers who can be engaged should they be required for specific repertoire. It is governed by the Choirs Aotearoa New Zealand Trust (which also governs the New Zealand Youth Choir and NZYC Alumni Choir) and the Chief Executive of the Trust is Roger Lloyd, who has held this position since late 2010. It has performed extensively throughout New Zealand, and has also attended a number of international festivals and competitions.

Their 2006 album Spirit of the Lord featured a number of composition from prominent New Zealand composers such as David Hamilton (composer) and Helen Fisher (composer). It received the award for Best Classical Album at the NZ Music Awards 2006.

It has been conducted since its formation by Dr Karen Grylls, an associate professor at the University of Auckland. In 2011 Voices New Zealand Chamber Choir represented New Zealand at the 9th World Choral Symposium in Argentina.

== See also ==
- New Zealand Youth Choir
