= Fraud (disambiguation) =

Fraud is intentional deception to secure unfair or unlawful gain, or to deprive a victim of a legal right.

Fraud or Frauds may also refer to:

- Fraud (book), 2006 non-fiction book
- Fraud (film), 2016 conceptual documentary film
- Frauds (film), 1993 Australian film
  - Frauds (soundtrack), soundtrack of the 1993 film
- Fraud (TV series), 2022 Pakistani television series
- Frauds (TV series), 2025 British television series
