= Greenbank, Edinburgh =

District of Edinburgh, Scotland

Coordinates: 55°54′57.16″N 3°13′10.25″W

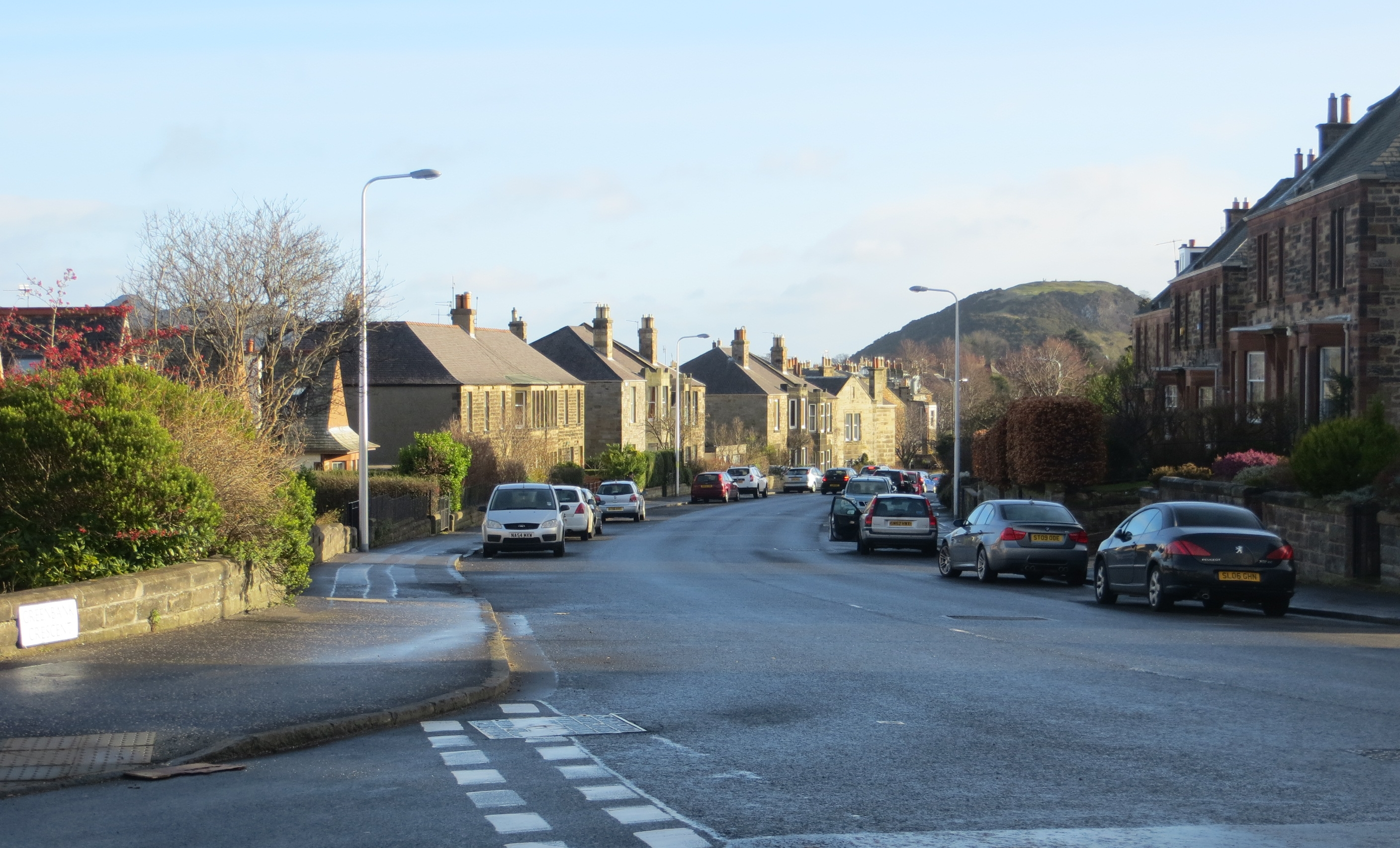
View of street in Greenbank

Greenbank is a residential district of south Edinburgh, Scotland. It is situated between the districts of Morningside and Oxgangs, i.e. slightly to the south-west of the heart of Morningside. The area was originally developed in the late 19th century, being completed in the early 1930s. The former City Hospital closed in 1999, after which modern flats and houses were constructed on Greenbank Drive, some of which incorporate parts of the Victorian contagious diseases isolation hospital. The area of the new development has become known as Greenbank Village.

== Church ==
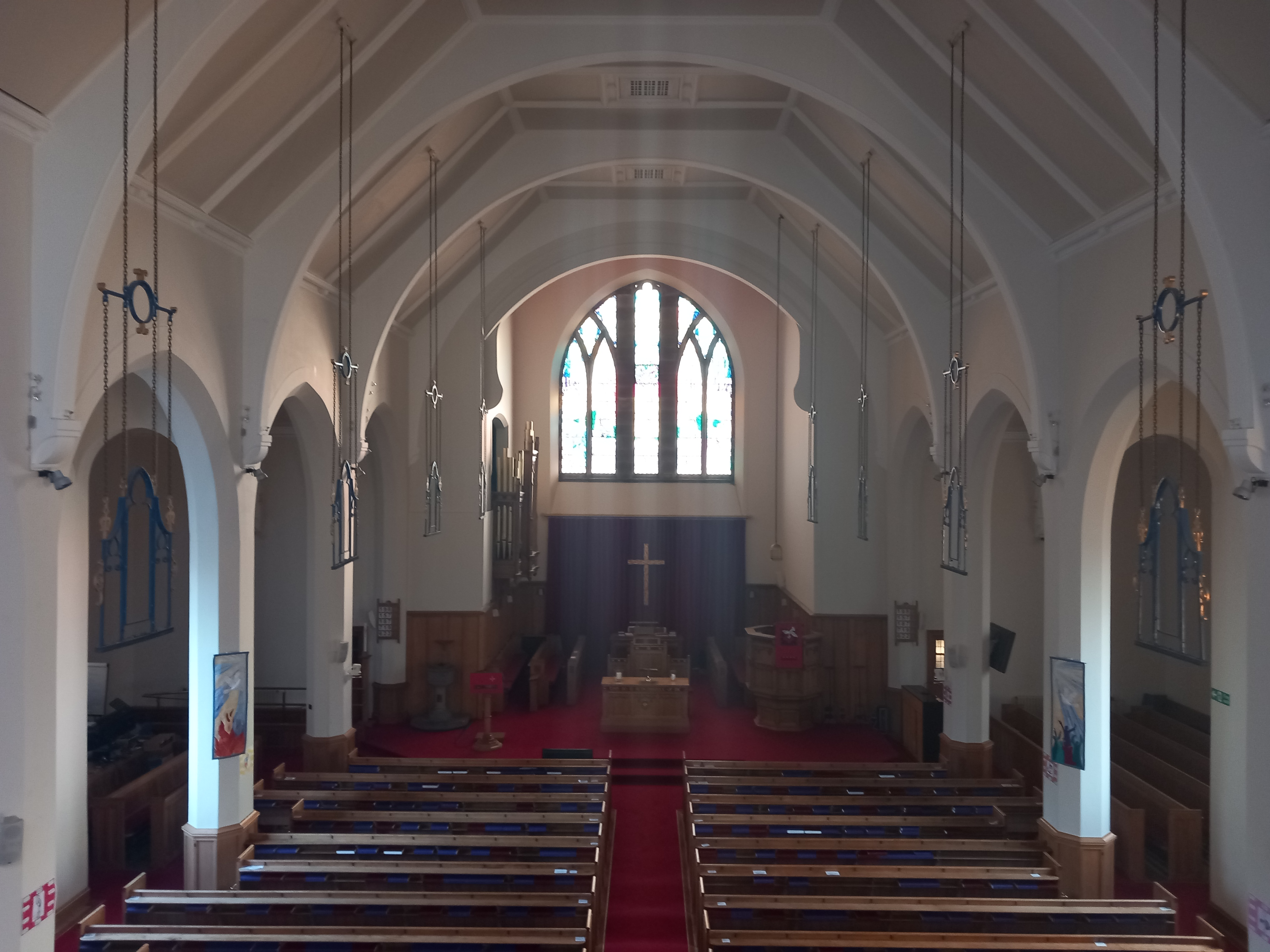
Greenbank Parish Church sanctuary

Greenbank Parish Church was founded in 1900 in Edinburgh, originally belonging to United Presbyterian Church. Following the denomination’s merger with the Free Church of Scotland (1843–1900) to form the United Free Church of Scotland, it in turn merged with the Church of Scotland in 1929. Greenbank Parish Church joined the Church of Scotland in 1929, just after the new church hall was built. The original church building is now one of the church's halls. A centenary hall and various meeting rooms were constructed in 2001.

Greenbank Parish Church's weekly Sunday services are also broadcast live, and recordings of past services are downloadable remotely from the church website.

The church's organist and choirmaster is Maestro Alberto Massimo, formerly an organist for Pope John Paul II and for Santa Cecilia in Trastevere. Massimo is also musical director of Dunbar Choral, and is a broadcaster for East Coast FM (Haddington). Prior to that, Dr Massimo had been organist for St Andrew's and St George's Church and was for 20 years Director of Music at Morningside United Church.

On 24 August 2024, the church was the venue for a recital and interview by former parishioner, Sir Donald Runnicles as Patron of the Wagner Society of Scotland, and baritone Thomas Lehman.

== Public transport ==
Public Transport is frequent with Lothian Buses operating scheduled services. Bus routes 5, 16, 23 and 36 plus night service N16 all serve the area.

== See also ==
- Morningside, Edinburgh
- Oxgangs
- Comiston
