= Victorian Philharmonic Orchestra =

Australian orchestra

The Victorian Philharmonic Orchestra is an Australian orchestra affiliated with the Melbourne Symphony Orchestra, and in 1999 had about 60 musicians. The orchestra has collaborated with numerous artists, including Australian alternative rock band, Jebediah and Indonesian artists Chrisye and Dwiki Dharmawan. It was hired by composer Guy Gross with Derek Williams as orchestrator and conductor to record the soundtrack for Stephan Elliott’s feature film Frauds, starring Phil Collins, Hugo Weaving and Josephine Byrnes.
