= Derek Williams (musician) =

British composer, orchestrator (born 1952)

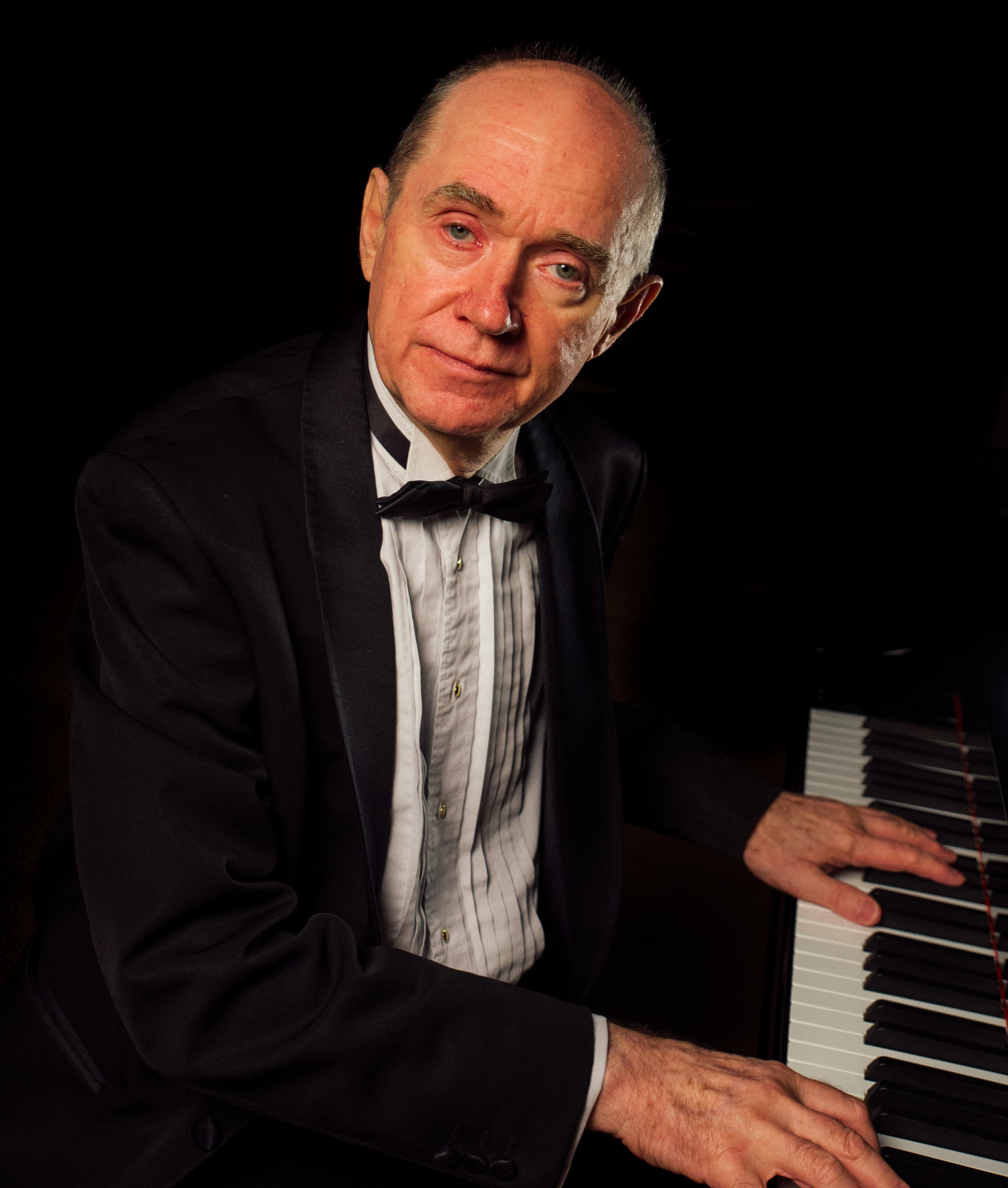
- Derek Williams at Reid School of Music (2017)

Background information
- Born: 20 September 1952 (age 74); Gisborne, New Zealand
- Genres: classical; jazz fusion; musical theatre; opera
- Occupations: composer; conductor; music arranger; musician; producer
- Years active: 1972–present
- Label: Mushroom Records
- Awards: Hon. Member, Music Arrangers Guild of Australia
- Website: derekwilliams.net

Academic background
- Education: University of Edinburgh (PhD); University of Auckland (BMus); Trinity College London (FTCL); Auckland College of Education (DipEd)
- Doctoral advisor: Peter Nelson; Nigel Osborne
- Influences: Richard Wagner; Oscar Wilde

Academic work
- Institutions: University of Edinburgh; University of Auckland

Derek Leslie Williams (born 20 September 1952) is a New Zealand-born Scottish composer, record producer, conductor, and orchestrator known for his scores for The Adventures of Priscilla, Queen of the Desert, Bodysurfer, Children of the Dragon, Come in Spinner, The Crossing, Crush, Frauds, The Other Side of Paradise, Ring of Scorpio, Seven Deadly Sins, Thank God He Met Lizzie, Visionaries, and for Frank Bennett, Stella Cole, Glenfiddich, Sir Robert Helpmann, Grace Knight, Debbie Newsome, Caroline O'Connor, Mikkel Rønnow and Torvill and Dean. He is currently serving his 9th term as Chair of the Wagner Society of Scotland, a member of the International Association of Wagner Societies (RWVI) and at the 2024 Assembly of Delegates at Deutsche Oper Berlin, he was elected to serve a 5-year term as board member of the RWVI Presidium.

Williams was awarded a doctorate by the University of Edinburgh for composition of his eponymous opera Wilde. He is also a Fellow of Trinity College London, and in 2025 he was made an Honorary Member of the Music Arrangers Guild of Australia. Since 2007, he has taught Composition and Orchestration at the Edinburgh University Reid School of Music. Williams is a civil rights activist known for his 'Save Sibelius' campaign in the United Kingdom (2012–2013).

== Career ==
Williams first came to public notice in 1974 when he founded the New Zealand School of Music, through which with conductor Juan Matteucci he established the first non-university tertiary level qualification for conductors of music in the Southern Hemisphere.

As a chorister, Williams performed in the 640 voice Third International Choral Festival at the Lincoln Center for the Performing Arts under Robert Shaw with Peter Godfrey's Auckland University Festival Choir, as well as at The White House, the Kennedy Center, the United Nations and at Westminster Abbey and King's College Chapel, Cambridge.

As arranger, orchestrator, conductor and musician commissioned by international artists Stella Cole, Caroline O'Connor, Sir Robert Helpmann, Torvill and Dean, Grace Knight, Frank Bennett, Debbie Newsome, Sir Howard Morrison, and Australian screen composers Martin Armiger, Guy Gross, and Antony Partos, Williams is also known for his reorchestrations of tracks from hit records. His commissions have been performed in the Glass Hall (Tivoli Gardens) Copenhagen, the Royal Albert Hall, Garrick Theatre and Kings Place (London), at the Sydney Opera House and Hamer Hall, Melbourne, Australia, and at the Montreux Jazz Festival.

Williams was the orchestrator and conductor of the Victorian Philharmonic Orchestra for Guy Gross's music for Stephan Elliott's Frauds, starring Phil Collins, Hugo Weaving and Josephine Byrnes, and was choral and instrumental arranger of Gross's music for Elliott's Oscar winning film The Adventures of Priscilla, Queen of the Desert. He was the orchestrator and conductor for Martin Armiger's music for The Crossing, starring Russell Crowe, and was orchestrator for the Australian Opera and Ballet Orchestra for Antony Partos' music for Crush that was winner of Best Film Score at New Zealand Film and TV Awards and Best Sound Track. Williams was arranger and conductor for the Australian Broadcasting Corporation double-platinum album Vince Jones & Grace Knight – Come in Spinner from the ABC miniseries Come in Spinner for record producer Martin Armiger, which won the ARIA Award for Best Adult Contemporary Album, peaked at No 4 on the ARIA Charts, and became the highest selling jazz album in Australian history with sales exceeding 230,000 copies. He was producer, arranger and conductor for Frank Bennett's EMI Music album Cash Landing, nominated at ARIA Music Awards of 1999 for Best Adult Contemporary Album. He was composer for Ruaridh M. Turner's The Beast in the Storm, which won Order of Merit in the Indie Fest and Best Action/Thriller/SciFi – Los Angeles Independent Film Festival Awards.

In 2016, Williams was conductor of the Lothian Festival Orchestra for live performances of The Snowman at St Mary's Collegiate Church, Haddington and in 2021 he was conductor of the Linlithgow String Orchestra and Abbotsford String Orchestra. In 2026, Williams was commissioned by Danish conductor Mikkel Rønnow and American jazz singer Stella Cole to adapt arrangements he had originally scored for Caroline O'Connor in 2005, for concerts at the Glassalen Copenhagen and Adelphi Theatre in London.

== Biography ==
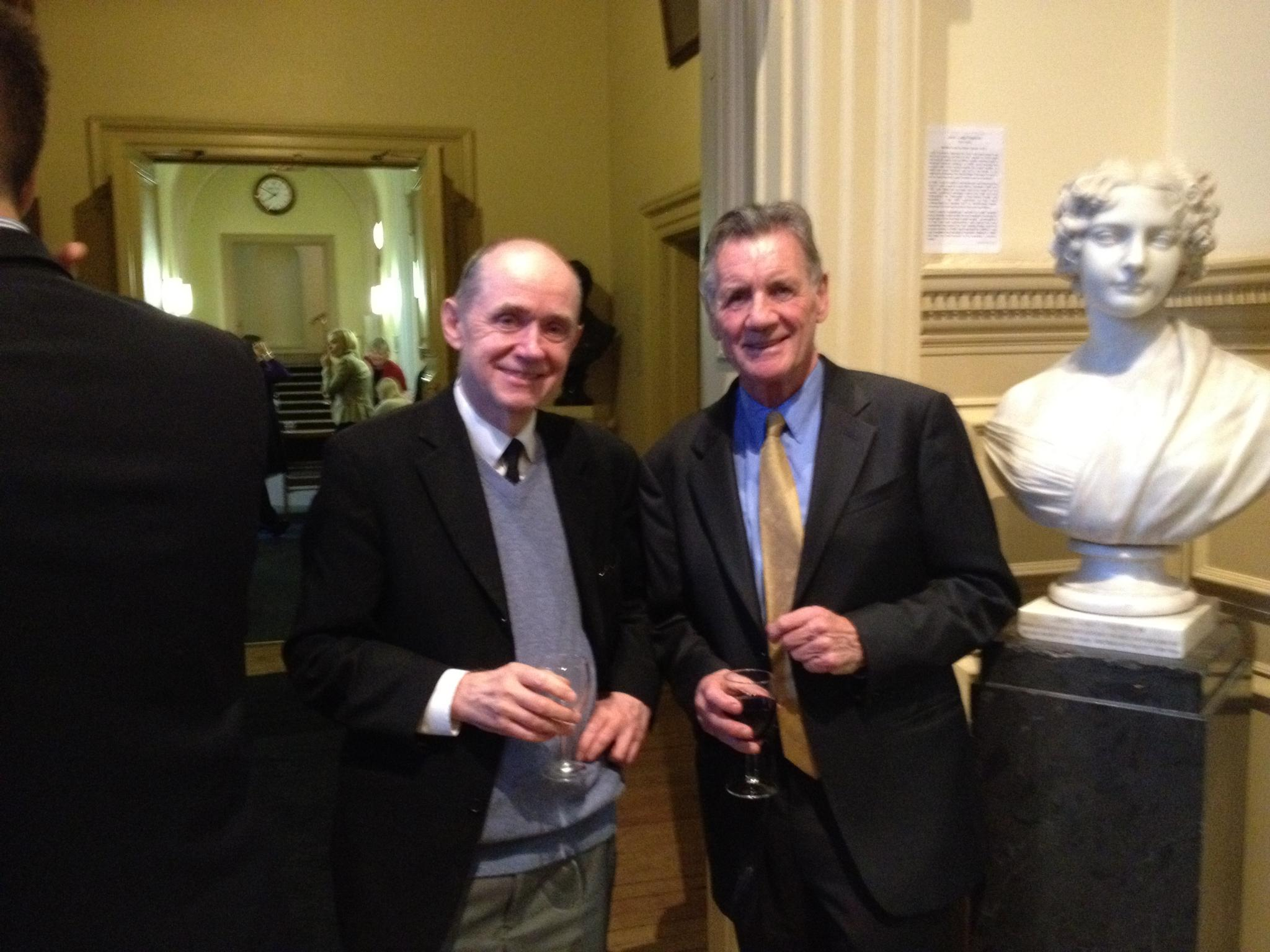
Derek Williams & Sir Michael Palin (President Royal Geographical Society) at the 2012 AGM. (Photo: Russell McGuirk)

=== Early life and education ===
Born 1952 to Agnes ('Nancy') Williams (née Anderson), an office clerk from Bathgate, Scotland and Edward ('Ted') Williams, a New Zealand farmer, Williams spent his early childhood in Gisborne, New Zealand and Rotorua.

Descended from Henry Williams, a missionary, and Marianne Coldham, an educator, Williams' grandfather, Claud Williams, was an explorer of the Libyan Egyptian desert during World War I earning the Military Cross for his Report on the Military Geography of the North-Western Desert of Egypt (War Office Handbook), used by the Long Range Desert Group in the Tobruk campaign against Rommel. In 2010, the Royal Geographical Society co-opted Williams as family representative for its publication of Claud's autobiographical memoir, Light Car Patrols 1916–19, and he was guest speaker at the 2013 book launch.

Educated at Rosmini College (Auckland) 1964–1970 while studying piano with Mary Nathan in Milford, Williams completed his early tertiary studies at the University of Auckland under Charles Nalden, Douglas Mews and Peter Godfrey, winning the Professor Hollinrake Memorial Scholarship and Senior Scholarship Award, graduating with a Bachelor of Music (BMus) in 1974. He followed this with a Diploma in Education (DipEd) from the Auckland Secondary Teachers College in 1978, subsequently qualifying DipTchg, and later as DipTeach after moving to New South Wales, Australia.

Continuing his piano studies with Mary Nathan alongside his undergraduate degree, Williams also gained professional diplomas through Trinity College London, qualifying as a Licentiate in Music (LMusTCL) and later being awarded a Fellowship (FTCL) in 1977. He completed his formal academic training under supervisors Peter Nelson and Nigel Osborne at the University of Edinburgh, where he was awarded a Doctor of Philosophy (PhD) in composition in 2012, and has taught part time since 2007.

=== New Zealand ===
==== International choral tour ====
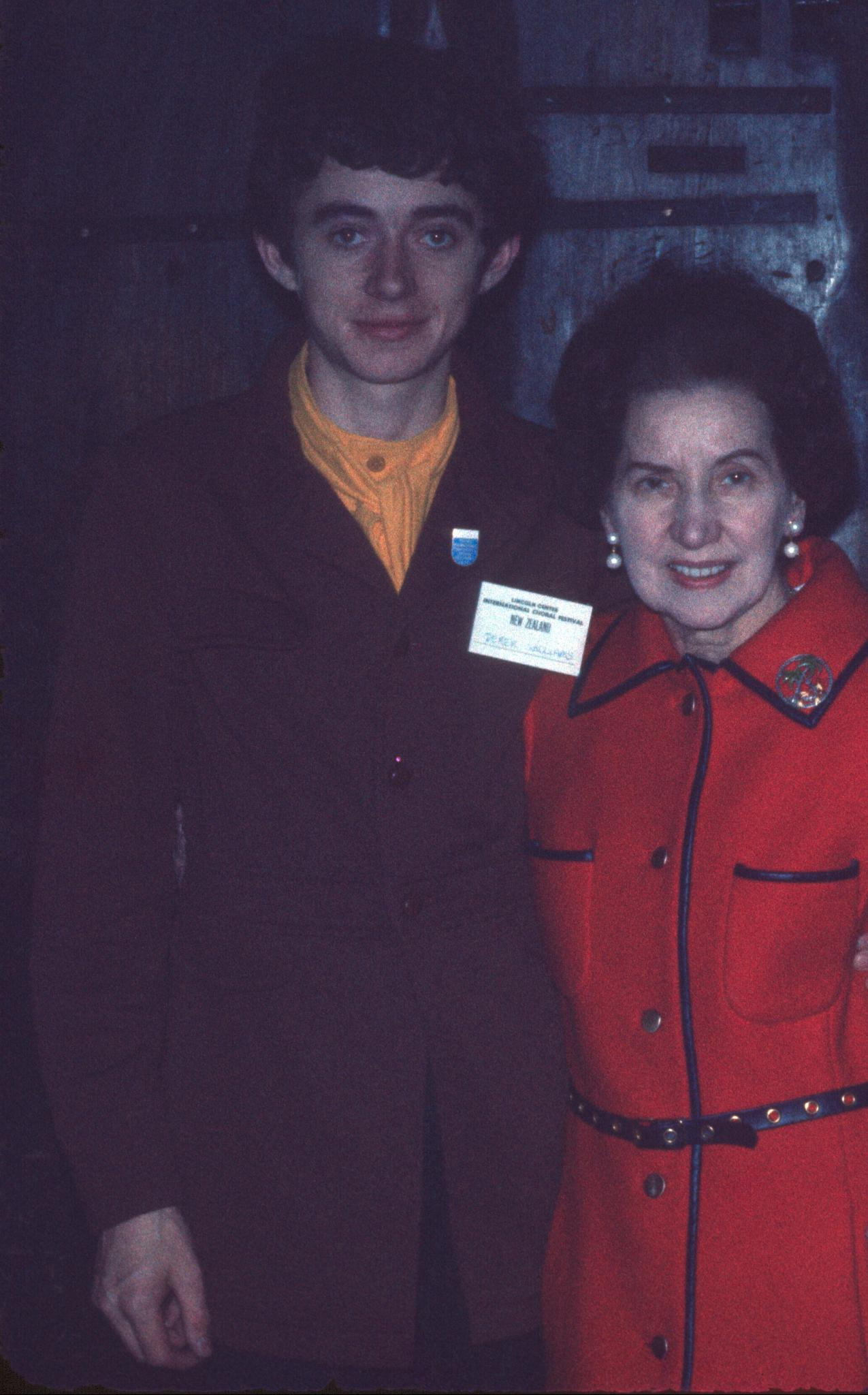
Williams (L) age 19 in Auckland University Festival Choir uniform by Colin Cole with friend after the choir's Lincoln Center performance (26 April 1972).

World tour as a chorister with the 40-voice Auckland University Festival Choir, conducted by Professor Peter Godfrey, a King's College, Cambridge alumnus and founder of the New Zealand Choral Federation and the Symphonia of Auckland. During the 3rd International University Choral Festival, at the United Nations, the choir participated in a massed chorus of 16 international choirs conducted by Willi Gohl, followed by a concert of 640 voices on 30 April 1972 at the Lincoln Center for the Performing Arts New York under Robert Shaw. During the US tour, the choir also performed at the John F. Kennedy Center for the Performing Arts and at a White House reception with the First Lady, Pat Nixon, on the eve of the breaking of the Watergate scandal. In the United Kingdom, the Festival Choir performed at Westminster Abbey and at King's College, Cambridge in a joint concert with King's College Choir with Sir David Willcocks. They were met by composer Benjamin Britten and tenor Peter Pears for the choir's recital at the Snape Maltings and the choir won praise for its performances in the Netherlands, Germany, Switzerland and Singapore. In 1998, there was a CD re-release of its LP, recorded straight after the world tour. Lauded as the "best choir New Zealand has produced", Godfrey's Festival Choir continued to hold decennial reunions until his death in 2017.

==== New Zealand School of Music ====
In 1974, Williams founded and until 1978 was governing director of the New Zealand School of Music Ltd under the patronage of the Mayor of Auckland, Sir Dove-Myer Robinson and with the conductor of the Symphonia of Auckland, Maestro Juan Matteucci, he established the first non-university tertiary level qualification for conductors of music in the Southern Hemisphere. Williams was also a course participant. This made the front page of the Auckland Star, and featured women conductors, including Alexandra Wiltshire who went on to become the first woman to conduct a major opera in New Zealand. Wiltshire later was a conductor of the Australian production of Cats at Theatre Royal, Sydney, for which Williams was also a keyboardist, for several hundred performances. There followed a similar course for percussionists, and in 1977 an Orchestral Training Scheme to be headed by Matteucci with Symphonia section leaders was announced, however this was shelved after funding failed to materialise.

==== Rotorua ====
During his tenure as teacher in charge of Music at Rotorua Boys' High School from 1979 to 1985, Williams was performer and musical director for numerous community productions, including Jesus Christ Superstar starring Rob Guest and as joint MD with Peter Lette for the Rotorua Operatic Society's 1980 production of Godspell at the Sir Howard Morrison Performing Arts Centre. In 1982, Williams was also keyboards player for Sir Howard Morrison. In 1984, he was seconded from teaching to work as a computer programmer of educational applications for New Zealand schools on the Poly-1 that allowed New Zealand educators to design and deliver curricula on class computer networks.

==== Aloha ====
In 1981 Williams was orchestrator and musical director for the world première and cast album of Eaton Magoon Jr and Sir Robert Helpmann's Hawaiian musical Aloha, starring Derek Metzger and directed by Robert Young for Hamilton Operatic Society at the Founders Theatre. Aloha received favourable reviews, with the New Zealand Herald reporting, "Derek Williams' orchestra helps to make the evening a success," and a cast recording produced by Carl Doy was made of the show at Mandrill Studios. The world premiere was followed in 1985 by a Michael Edgley revival production at His Majesty's Theatre, Auckland, directed by Joe Layton, also starring Metzger and Hollywood actress Patricia Morison, with Williams continuing as production arranger and musical director.

=== Australia ===
From 1985, Williams was musical director and keyboards player for productions at Australia's Wonderland, Phillip Street Theatre, Glen Street Theatre and Sydney Theatre Restaurants Ltd and from 1985 to 1988 he was orchestrator for the Australian Singing Competition, initially at the Sydney Opera House. He was also a keyboards player for over 400 performances of Cats for Cameron Mackintosh at the Theatre Royal, Sydney, the longest running show in Australian history, and for its 1994 revival by the Really Useful Group at Her Majesty's Theatre, Sydney. Following the success of Australian Broadcasting Corporation's Come in Spinner (miniseries) and platinum spin-off album Vince & Grace, Williams continued as musical director and arranger for the CD launch and Grace Knight's promotional tour for Kevin Jacobsen, as well as for tours with Perfect Match star, Debbie Newsome.

Williams was an early adopter and exponent of digital music technology, using two Kurzweil K250 ROM sample instruments in his orchestrations for the ill-fated Australian Bicentenary musical Manning Clark's History of Australia - The Musical, one of whose composers was record producer and film composer Martin Armiger. Williams thereafter began working with Armiger in various roles for 15 film and TV scores and was also orchestrator and conductor for screen composers Guy Gross and Antony Partos.

In 1989, Williams and Armiger were called as expert witnesses in the Federal Court of Australia supporting a copyright infringement case brought by Guy Gross against CBS Records Australia Limited and Collette Roberts, with the court finding in the defendants' favour. Also in 1989, Williams was choral arranger and pianist for Torvill and Dean's album Here We Stand, produced by Kevin Stanton, and recorded while Christopher Dean was laid up in Sydney, recuperating from a torn ligament.

From 1995 to 1997, Williams was musical director and Conductor of the Orchestra and Choir of the Waverley-Randwick Philharmonic Society, while studying conducting with Myer Fredman.

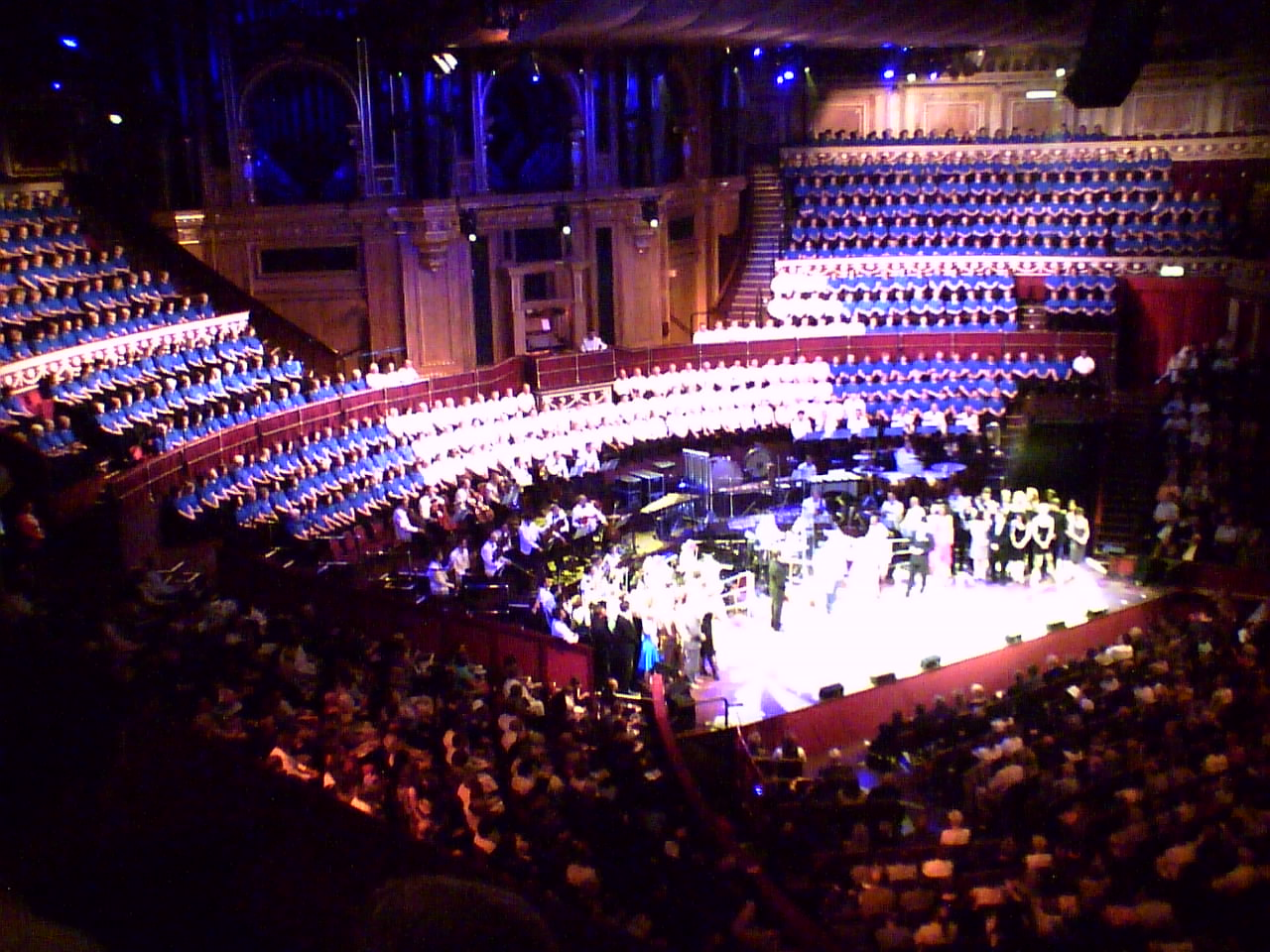
The Night of 1000 Voices 2007 concert at the Royal Albert Hall, starring Caroline O'Connor.

In 1998, Williams was record producer, arranger and conductor for Frank Bennett's album Cash Landing for EMI Music Australia, which was nominated for an ARIA Award for Best Adult Contemporary Album (1999) and from 1989 to 2006, he was a Higher School Certificate examiner and advisor in Music and Computing Studies for the New South Wales Board of Studies while teaching at Randwick Boys High School (1985–2006).

In 2005, Williams began a long-standing association with Caroline O'Connor as arranger for her show End of the Rainbow at the Sydney Opera House and for her album A Tribute to Garland recorded at the Opera House, and launched in an outdoor big band concert in Sydney's Taronga Park with Williams as keyboardist. Williams was also commissioned as arranger for her debut performance at Kander and Ebb – The Night of 1000 Voices on 6 May 2007, at the Royal Albert Hall, produced by Hugh Wooldridge and conducted by David Firman with John Kander present, subsequently for her Garrick Theatre season of The Showgirl Within, and for the opening of Hamer Hall, Melbourne.

=== Scotland ===
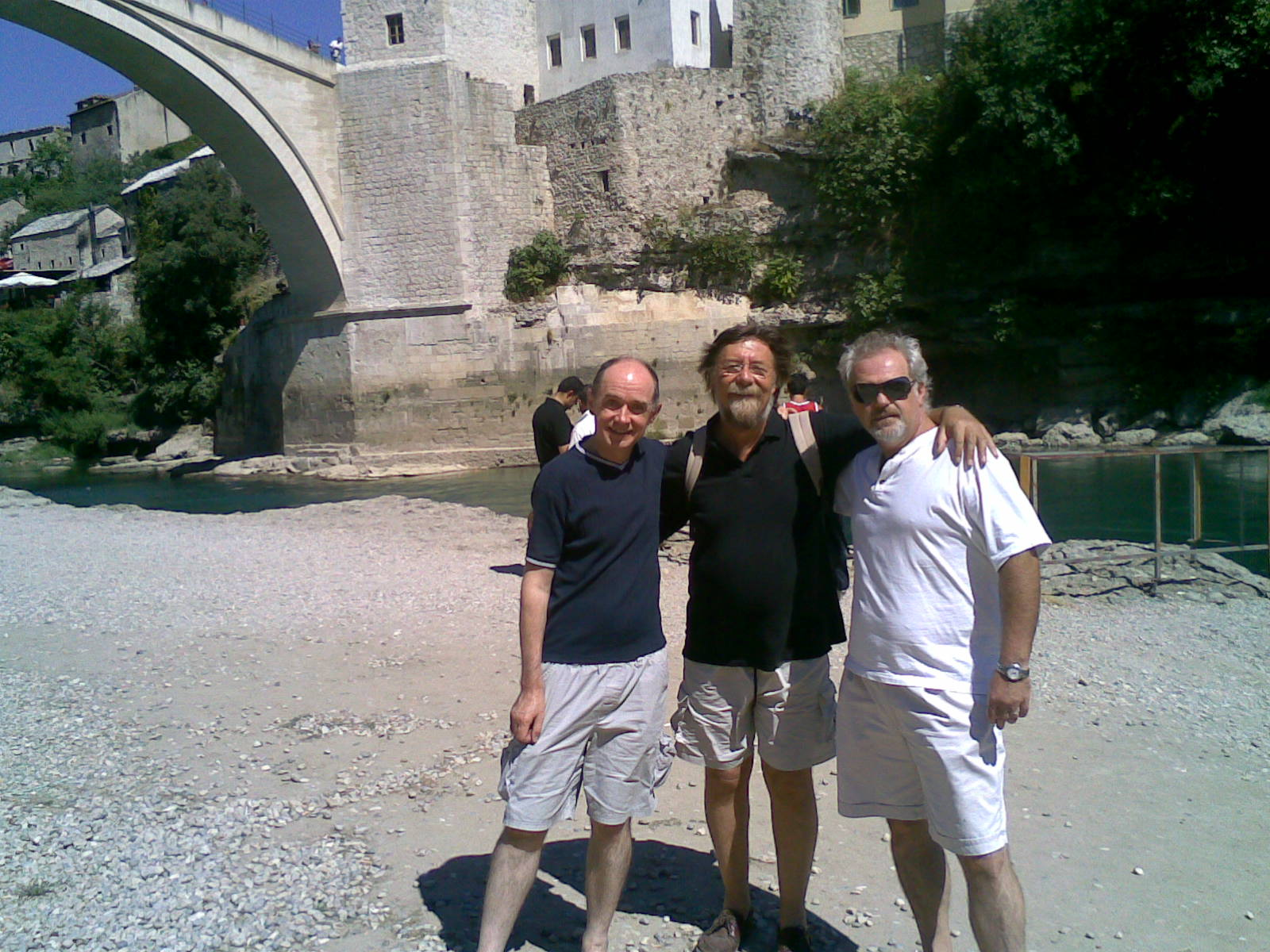
Nigel Osborne Balkans Music Therapy camps. From left: Derek Williams, Nigel Osborne, Ermin Elezovic at the rebuilt Mostar Bridge.

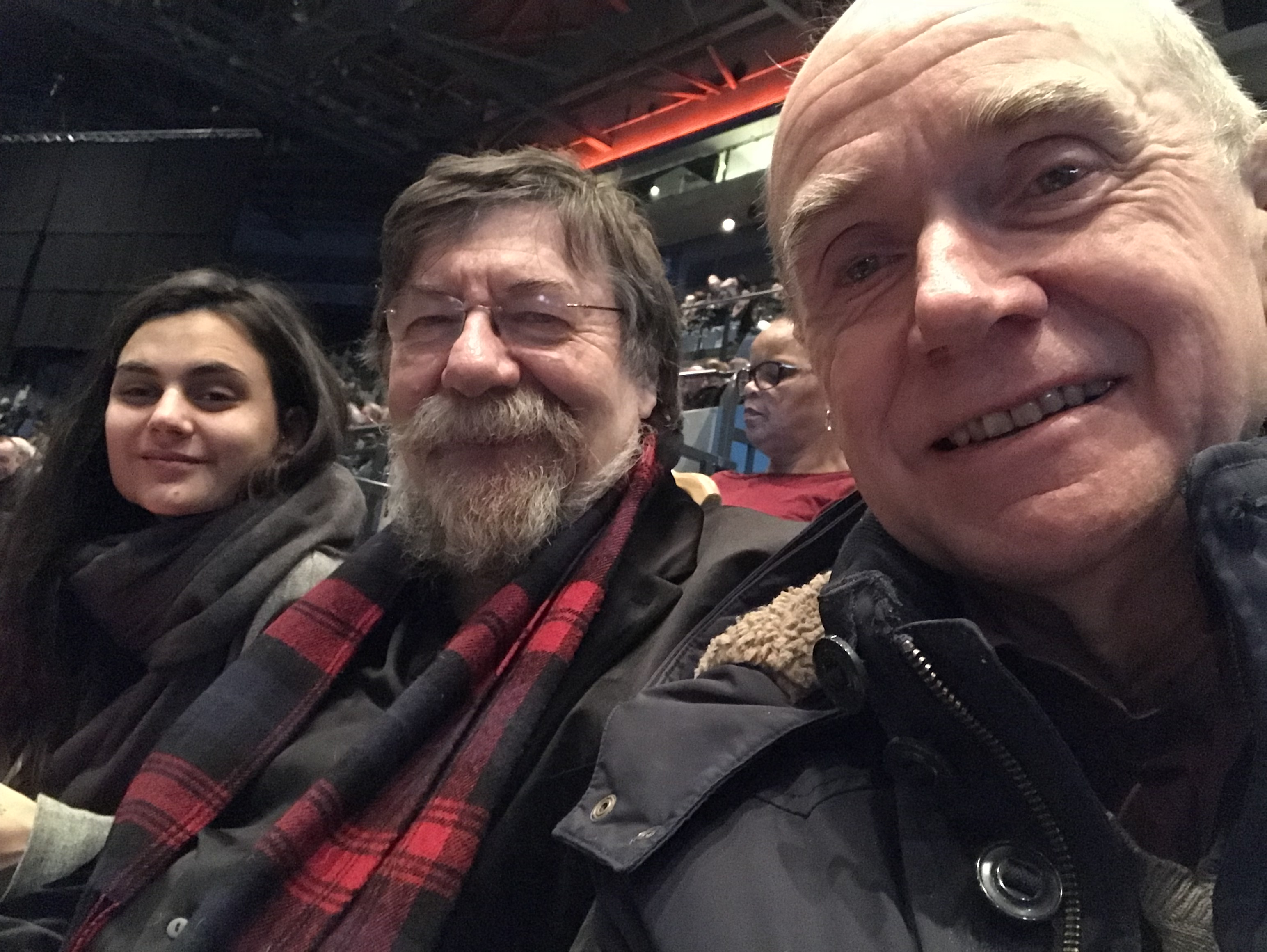
It Was 50 Years Ago Today Bootleg Beatles concert. From left: Mimi Serbedzija, Nigel Osborne, Derek Williams at Echo Arena.

Projects with Nigel Osborne

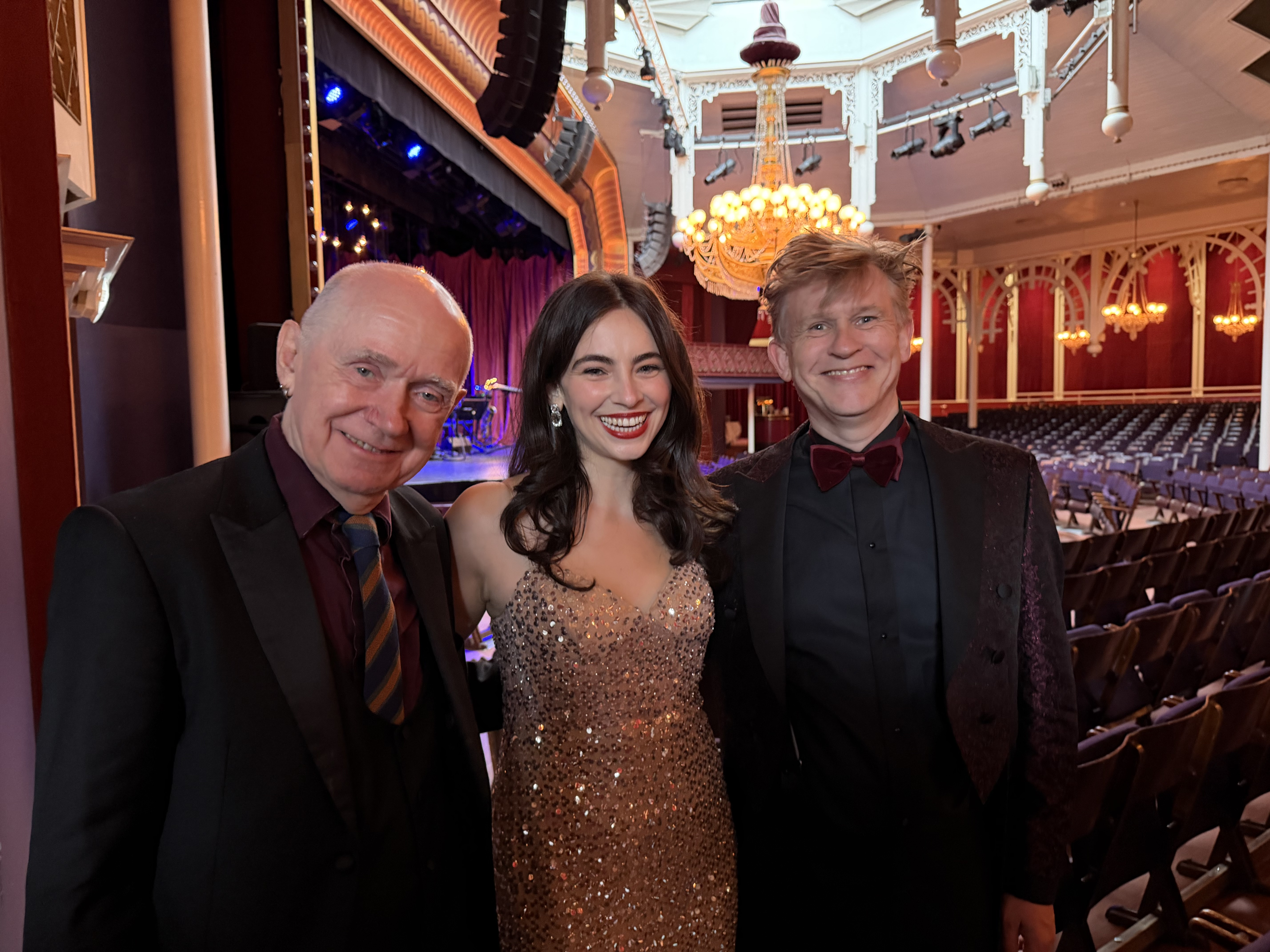
From left: arranger Derek Williams, singer Stella Cole, conductor Mikkel Rønnow, Glassalen 19 April 2026

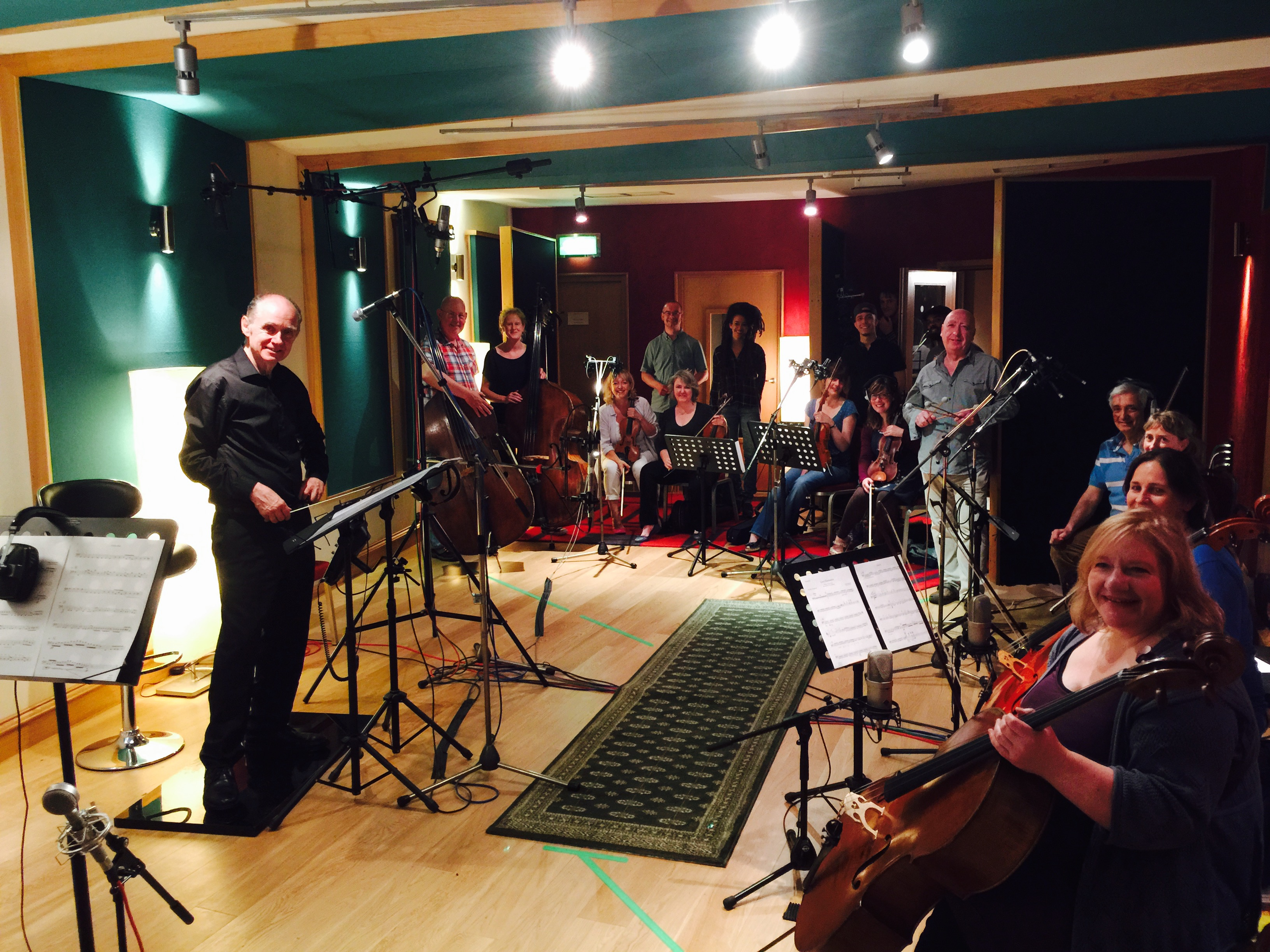
Derek Williams conducting 'McOpera' (Scottish Opera) Orchestra with Calma Carmona recording Glenfiddich 21yo whisky ad at Gorbals Sound.

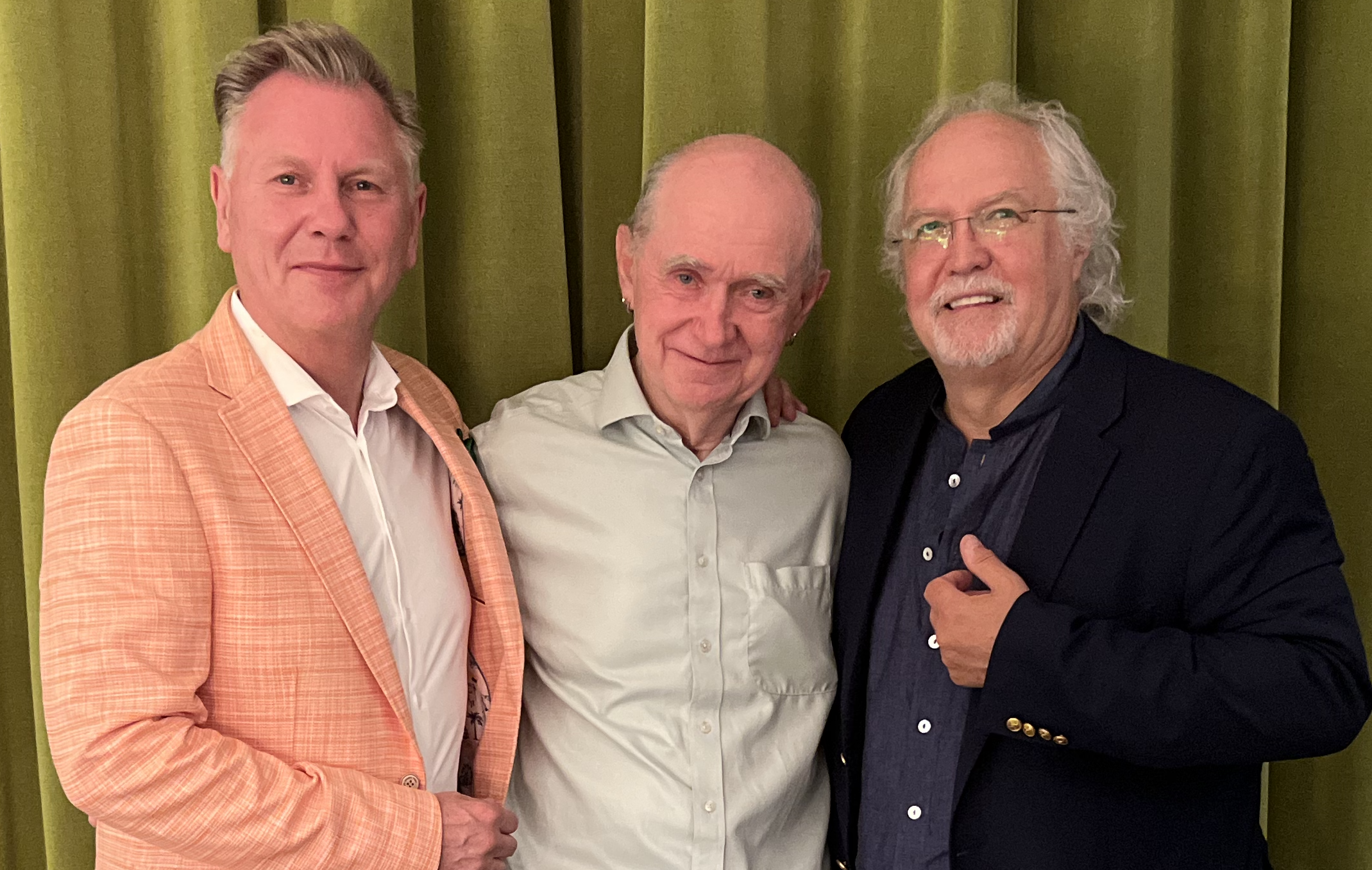
RWVI Congress at Deutsche Oper Berlin 2024, from left: Harry Leutscher (President), Derek Williams (Chair Wagner Society of Scotland), Sir Donald Runnicles (Conductor)

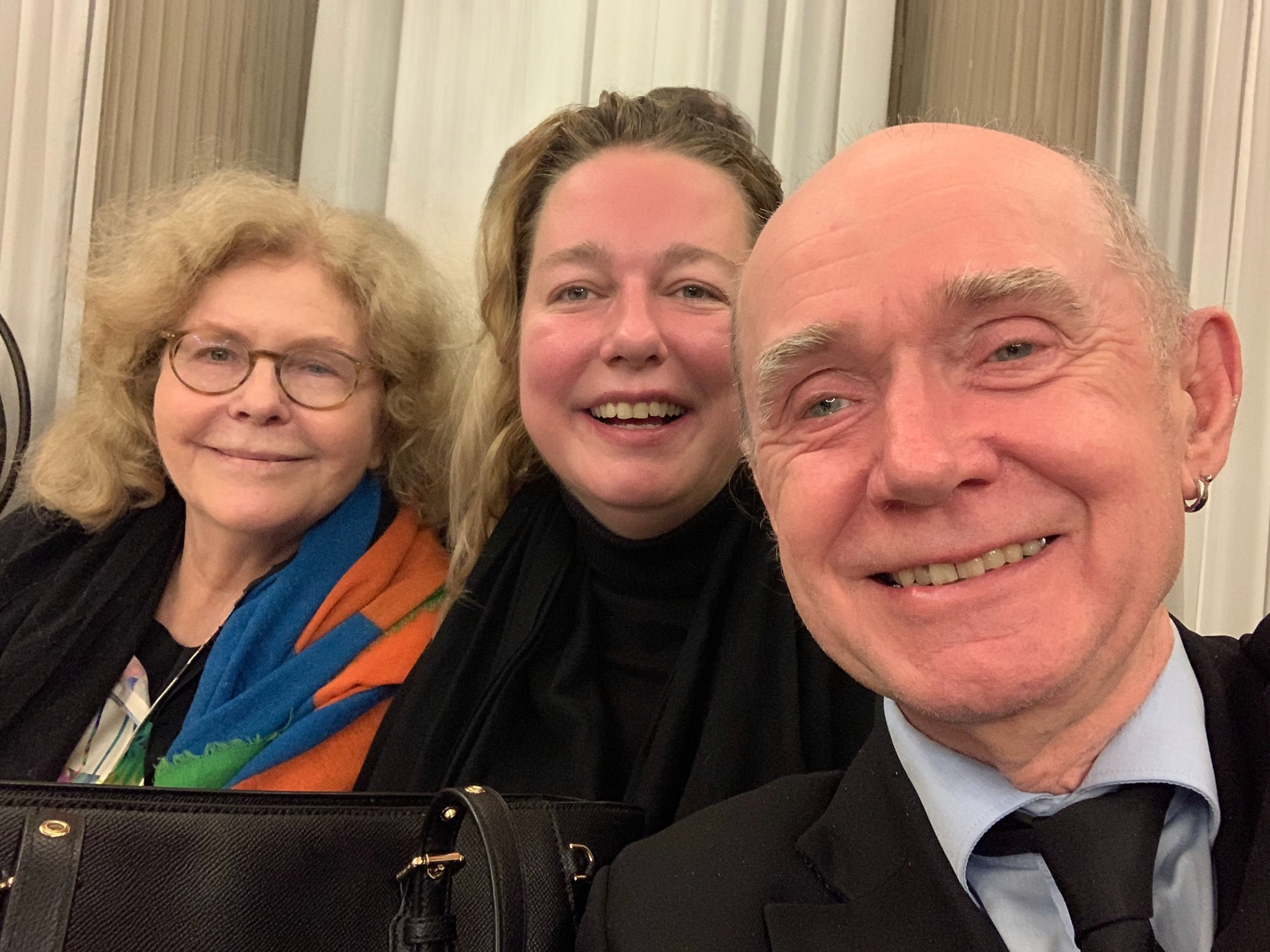
From left: Eva Wagner-Pasquier and Katharina Wagner with Derek Williams, Scottish delegate at the 2019 RWVI Congress in Venice.

Williams was répétiteur and assistant conductor for Edinburgh Grand Opera's production of Faust, and was musical director for the Edinburgh University Savoy Opera Group's production of Salad Days for the 2007 Edinburgh Festival Fringe. He was also Funding Manager for Edinburgh Studio Opera and the Edinburgh Contemporary Music Ensemble.

In 2008, Williams joined with Professor Nigel Osborne in his Balkans Music Therapy camps in Mostar and Rakovica for Bosnian War orphans, on behalf of Edinburgh University. He was also commissioned by Osborne to create Vienna Symphonic Library transcriptions of his orchestral arrangements for the Bootleg Beatles concerts It Was Fifty Years Ago Today, with the Royal Liverpool Philharmonic Orchestra at the Royal Albert Hall and Echo Arena Liverpool.

In 2013, Williams' one act opera Medea received its world premiere at the Edinburgh Jazz Bar during the Edinburgh Festival Fringe, and was repeated at Edinburgh University's Reid Concert Hall.

In 2015, Williams was arranger, conductor and composed additional music for the Glenfiddich 21 Year Old Whisky ad campaign featuring Calma Carmona performing the Franz Ferdinand song Love Illumination with the orchestra of the Scottish Opera arranged and conducted by Williams, which gained 1.7 million hits on YouTube. In 2018, the Hindemith Trio commissioned and performed the world premiere of Williams' The Traveller for the Fondazione Giorgio e Aurora Giovannini at the Parma Conservatory, Italy.

Williams was elected Chair of the Wagner Society of Scotland in 2017, and has presented lectures on The Third Reich, Wahnfried, Siegfried Wagner and the Christianity of Richard Wagner. He represents the Society at the Bayreuth Festival and at the annual RWVI Congress, and since June 2024 has served on the RWVI Presidium.

In Spring of 2026, Williams was commissioned by Danish conductor Mikkel Rønnow and American jazz singer, Stella Cole to refashion arrangements of the Judy Garland classics "The Man That Got Away" and "Almost Like Being in Love" he had scored in 2005 for Caroline O'Connor at the Sydney Opera House and Taronga Park, for concerts at the Glass Hall (Tivoli Gardens) ("Glassalen") Theatre in Copenhagen. The concerts played to capacity audiences, who gave spontaneous standing ovations, and received favourable reviews, with Danish critic Michael Søby describing the orchestra as "extraordinarily well-played" and "The Man That Got Away" as one of the highlights. Following the success of the Copenhagen performances, Williams was retained to provide arrangements for Cole's UK tour, commencing at the Adelphi Theatre in London on 28 March 2027.

== Civil rights activism ==
=== 'Save Sibelius' campaign ===
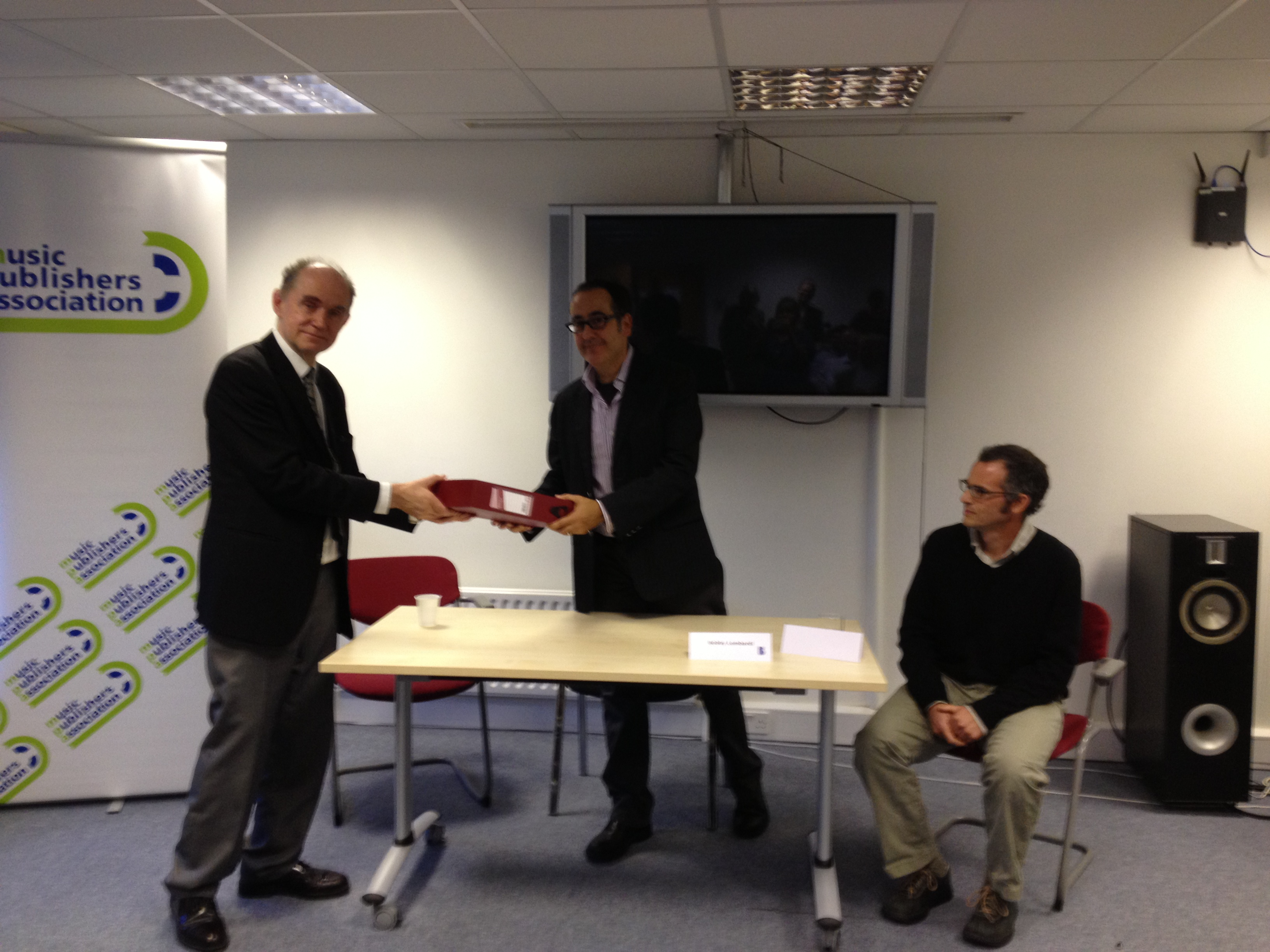
3 October 2012: Derek Williams at BASCA, London, delivering his 'Sell Sibelius' petition with 11,590 signatures to Bobby Lombardi, new managing director of Sibelius.

On 19 July 2012, the 'Save Sibelius' activist group was formed by Derek Williams to try to future-proof the Sibelius scorewriter application after Avid Tech fired all but three of the Sibelius development team and closed their London office to relocate jobs offshore to Ukraine and California. Williams co-opted Richie Vitale and a small team of other musicians to petition Avid to reverse their decision. Because of past experience with orphaned music technology and abandonware such as the Mosaic notation program and OMS, it was feared that the Sibelius application would likewise ultimately cease development, thereby leaving its users without updates to ensure the application would remain compatible with future operating system upgrades.

To raise public awareness among the half million Sibelius users, the group launched a Facebook campaign, duplicated on Google Plus. Within its first week, 485,000 Facebook hits were generated, with 12,000 followers joining the page, alongside growing music industry media interest. The Avid board of directors, who had been targeted by a letter writing campaign initiated from the Save Sibelius website, began issuing public reassurances on their own blog websites and social media that they intended to keep Sibelius alive. After Williams' 6 August 2012 Podcast interview with The Audio Podcast, there followed a BBC Radio 4 radio interview about the campaign on You and Yours with composer Paul Mealor on 24 August 2012, indicating that Sibelius users were not convinced.

In October 2012, after attempts by the Sibelius creators, brothers Ben and Jonathan Finn and other investors approached by the group to buy back the application from Avid proved unsuccessful, Williams launched a Change.org petition called "chris-gahagan-senior-vice-president-of-products-sell-sibelius" to try to persuade Avid Tech to divest itself of Sibelius. After reaching 11,590 signatures, the petition was presented by Williams in person to Sibelius Software executives from Avid invited to an extraordinary meeting held by the British Academy of Songwriters, Composers and Authors (BASCA) at its London offices on 3 October. Amid subsequent collapsing share performance that involved Avid's delisting by NASDAQ, Avid Tech CEO Gary Greenfield stepped down, while Bobby Lombardi was replaced by long-time Sibelius employee Sam Butler as the new Sibelius product manager.

Central to the Save Sibelius campaign were the issues of orphaned technology, abandonware, planned obsolescence, asset stripping, and the perceived impact of Avid Tech's actions on employees, shareholders and consumers. The firing of the Sibelius development team led directly to their engagement by the Yamaha Corporation subsidiary Steinberg to develop a rival application to Sibelius. Williams ended the campaign in February 2013, after Steinberg announced they had hired the majority of the former Sibelius development team to develop Dorico, under the stewardship of former Sibelius product manager, Daniel Spreadbury.

The Facebook 'Save Sibelius' campaign created by Williams and Vitale remains active, with 9,300 followers.

=== LGBT+ rights activism ===
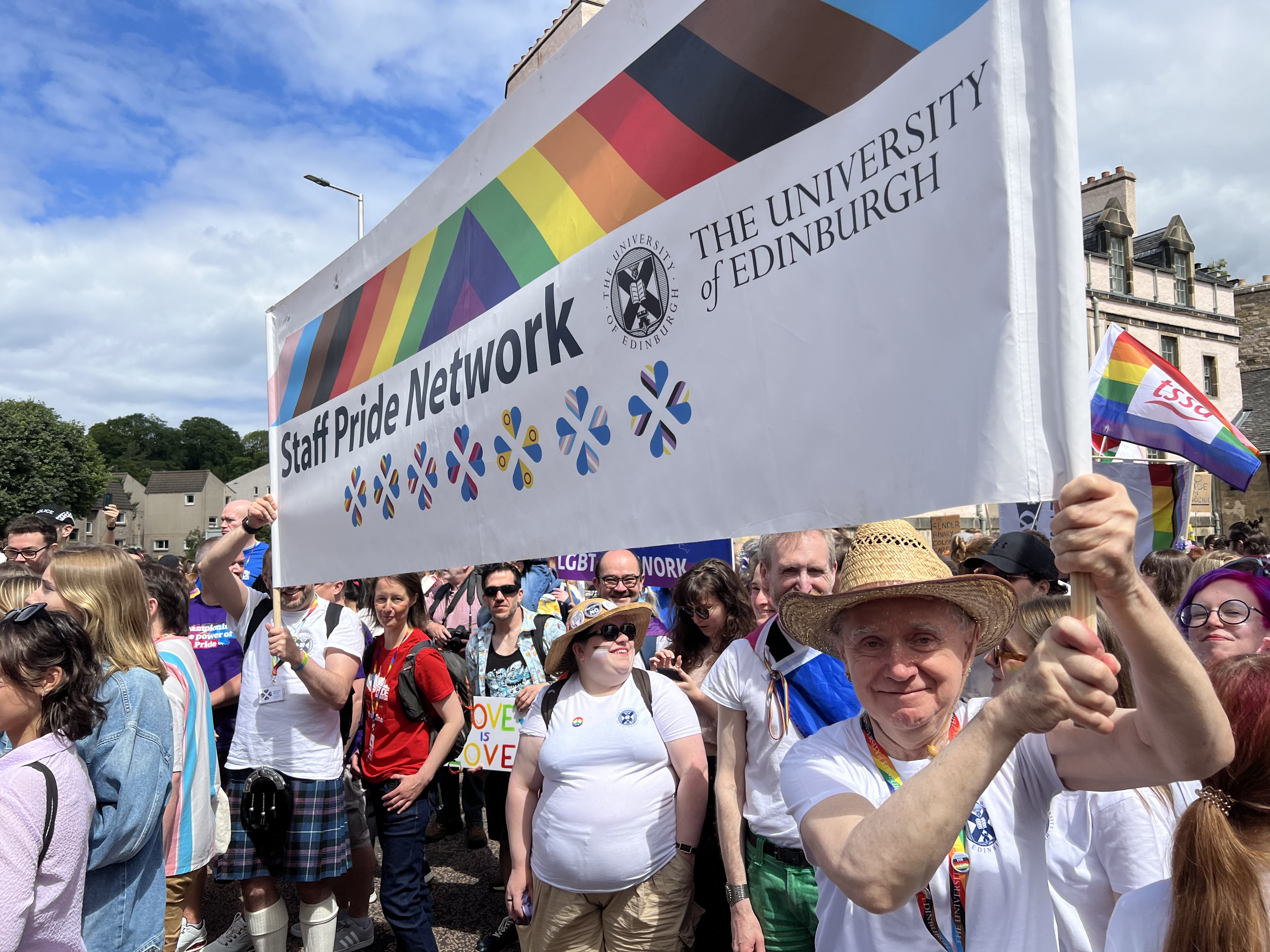
Williams (R) holding banner.

Edinburgh University Staff Pride Network, Pride Edinburgh 2024

After having worked with New Zealand Labour Party MP Fran Wilde in support of her Homosexual Law Reform Act 1986, from 1990 Williams became involved with LGBT rights in New South Wales Australia, initially as a witness for a discrimination case brought by Redjoy Pty Ltd (trading as 'Gai Expectations') against Sydney City Council Employees Credit Union, interviewed on Nine Network's A Current Affair by Eric Campbell.

In 1991, amid a spate of murders of gay men by school-age youths, Williams co-founded and was six times re-elected co-convenor of the Gay & Lesbian Teachers & Students Association (GaLTaS), established to publicise widespread problems of anti-gay bullying and violence in Australian schools, and to provide support to its victims. In March 1993, GaLTaS was awarded a Federal National Youth Grant of $30,000 (=c.$72,947.57 equivalent in 2026) by the Australian Government to assess the scale of school-based homophobia. From May 1993, Williams began to call on the parliament to remove private schools' LGBT+ related exemptions from the New South Wales Anti-Discrimination Act 1977.

In the course of his GaLTaS co-convenorship, while teaching at Randwick Boys High School, Williams worked with New South Wales Education Minister Virginia Chadwick, MP Clover Moore, Australian Medical Association President Kerryn Phelps, Parents and Citizens (P&C), PFLAG, the New South Wales Teachers Federation, New South Wales Anti-discrimination Board and NSW Police concerning ongoing issues of school homophobia. During GaLTaS' active period, Williams frequently appeared in press and television coverage of LGBT issues, including the Today Show, The 7.30 Report, Australian Broadcasting Corporation Attitude program Nine Network's 60 Minutes and the TV series Sex episode "Homosexuality", and was interviewed by Quentin Dempster, Eric Campbell and Sophie Lee.

In 1997 Williams addressed the Parliament of Australia forum on youth suicide convened by then Prime Minister, John Howard, working with PFLAG who also attended. In the same year, he was a GaLTaS witness in submissions on behalf of LGBT+ teachers and students to the Human Rights & Equal Opportunity Commission under Chris Sidoti and the Justice James Roland Wood Royal Commission into the New South Wales Police Service.

In 1998, GaLTaS was absorbed into the New South Wales Teachers Federation as a Special Interest Group, with Williams as a founding member. Since 2008, Williams has been active in LGBT+ politics in Scotland and in 2018, was co-opted as Meetings Secretary of the Edinburgh University Staff Pride Network.

== Credits ==
=== Film and television ===
Commissioning composers: Martin Armiger, Guy Gross, Antony Partos, Roy Hubermann, David Kimber

Commissioning organisations: Royal Hospital for Sick Children, Edinburgh, Australian Broadcasting Corporation, Nine Network, EMI Music Australia, Festival Mushroom Records, Picture This Music, John Singleton Ltd

The following is a list of moving image works in which Williams is credited as a composer, orchestrator, arranger, conductor, musician, or audio engineer for various feature films, television dramas, and documentaries:

Year	Title	Medium	Role(s)	Production Company / Client / Notes
2016	The Beast in the Storm	Film	Composer, orchestrator, musician, audio engineer	Turner Gang short film; directed by Ruaridh M. Turner; LAIFF Winner
2015	The Finishing Touch	Television	Composer (additional music), arranger, orchestrator, conductor, mixing and mastering engineer	TV & Online Media global commercial campaign for Glenfiddich launch of 21yo single malt
2015	The Infinity Project	Film	Musician (Synthesizers)	Sci-fi short film
2015	Mail Porter	Documentary Film	Composer, orchestrator, musician, audio engineer	Documentary film commissioned by the Royal Hospital for Sick Children, Edinburgh
2013	The Making of Longbird	Documentary Film	Musician	Edinburgh College of Art production; BAFTA Award-winning mockumentary film directed by Will Anderson
2013	Plot for Peace	Documentary Film	Orchestrator	Documentary film; includes the "Empire" track soundtrack feature
2001	Hildegarde	Film	Orchestrator	Screen Australia family feature film starring Richard E. Grant; music by Martin Armiger
2001	Hard Knox	Television	Orchestrator, composer (additional music)	Action telemovie production directed by Peter Bloomfield; music by Martin Armiger
1997	Thank God He Met Lizzie (aka The Wedding Party)	Film	Arranger, orchestrator, conductor	Stamen Films Ltd feature starring Cate Blanchett; music by Martin Armiger
1997	Empire	Television	Orchestrator	ABC Indigenous Unit production for the Festival of the Dreaming; music by Antony Partos
1995	Cody	Television	Arranger, orchestrator, conductor	Six-part action drama series for Seven Network
1995	ABC Cable TV News	Television	Composer, arranger, producer	Network launch theme demo
1995	Black Swan	Documentary Film	Orchestrator	Documentary film; music by Antony Partos
1994	The Adventures of Priscilla, Queen of the Desert	Film	Orchestrator, choral and instrumental arranger	PolyGram Filmed Entertainment Academy Award-winning film; original music by Guy Gross
1994	Widows	Documentary Film	Arranger, orchestrator	Australian movie production directed by Roy Hubermann
1993	Frauds	Film	Orchestrator, conductor, composer (additional music)	J & M Entertainment feature directed by Stephan Elliott starring Phil Collins
1993	Seven Deadly Sins	Television	Arranger, musician	ABC TV anthology miniseries; music by Martin Armiger
1992	Crush	Film	Orchestrator	Australian Film Commission entry directed by Alison Maclean; Cannes Film Festival entry
1992	Blinky Bill	Television	Orchestrator, conductor	Yoram Gross Productions animated series adaptation; music by Guy Gross
1992	Police Rescue	Television	Composer (additional music), arranger, keyboard programming	ABC TV series collaboration with Martin Armiger
1992	The Other Side of Paradise	Television	Orchestrator, conductor, composer (additional music)	Network Ten TV miniseries set in the South Pacific; music by Martin Armiger
1991	Children of the Dragon	Television	Orchestrator, conductor	ABC / BBC Television drama miniseries based on the Tiananmen Square protests of 1989
1990	The Wonderful World of Dogs	Documentary Film	Composer (additional music), orchestrator	Documentary film directed by Mark Lewis; music by Martin Armiger
1990	Come in Spinner	Television	Arranger, orchestrator, conductor	ABC TV miniseries; double-platinum soundtrack release
1990	The Crossing	Film	Orchestrator, conductor, piano, composer (additional music)	Beyond International romantic drama starring Russell Crowe; music by Martin Armiger
1990	Ring of Scorpio	Television	Orchestrator, conductor, composer (additional music)	Film Finance Corporation Australia, BBC Television, and Nine Network three-part drama serial
1989	In Grave Danger of Falling Food	Documentary Film	Composer, arranger, orchestrator, musician	220 Productions documentary directed by Bill Leimbach, featuring Bill Mollison
1989	You've Always Got the Blues	Television	Arranger, orchestrator	Tie-in television special for ABC TV
1989	Bodysurfer	Television	Orchestrator, conductor, musician	ABC TV drama serial directed by Ian Barry; music by Martin Armiger
1989	The Rainbow Warrior Conspiracy	Television	Arranger, orchestrator	Seven Network public drama miniseries covering the political event
1989	Arthur Young Corporate Video	Television	Composer, arranger, producer	Broadcom corporate documentary video commission
1988	The Last Resort	Television	Orchestrator, conductor, composer (additional music)	Weekly late-night series for ABC TV; music by Martin Armiger
1988	Seven Network TV Sports IDs & Station ID	Television	Composer, arranger, orchestrator	Seven Network promotional themes including the "Let's Celebrate '88" campaign
1988	Flashbacks	Television Documentary	Audio engineer	ABC TV production series

=== Discography ===
The following is a list of studio albums, soundtracks, and cast recordings featuring Williams as a producer, conductor, arranger, orchestrator, musical director, or chorister:

Year	Title	Artist / producer	Credited as	Genre	Record label	Format	ID	Notes
2015	Mail Porter	Sandie Jamieson for Royal Hospital for Sick Children, Edinburgh	composer, orchestrator, musician, audio engineer	Documentary	Edinburgh Sick Kids Friends Foundation	DVD	Mail Porter (Video 2015) at IMDb	Historical documentary prior to move to Little France site; narration by Alexander McCall Smith
2009	Encounters; The Edinburgh Quartet	Derek Williams	producer, composer	Classical	Edinburgh University	2 CD	ASIN B07B1TMNYV	funded by the Roberts Fund
2005	A Tribute to Garland	Caroline O'Connor	arranger, orchestrator, musician	Musical theatre	Artists Unlimited	CD		Recorded at the Sydney Opera House
2004	Glen Wood Tap, The Syllabus	Glen Wood	composer, musician, sound recordist	Tap dance	Glen Wood Tap	DVD set		
2004	Glen Wood Tap, The Syllabus	Glen Wood	composer, musician, sound recordist	Tap dance	Glen Wood Tap	CD set		
1998	Cash Landing (Album)	Frank Bennett	producer, arranger, orchestrator, conductor	Jazz, Pop	Capitol, EMI Music Australia, Virgin	CD Album	EMI UPC = 7243 4 98085 2 2	ARIA Award nomination
1998	Cash Landing (Single)	Frank Bennett	producer, arranger, orchestrator, conductor	Jazz, Pop	Capitol, EMI Music Australia, Virgin	CD Single	Virgin UPC = 7243 8 86610 2 7	Opportunities
1998	Australian Dance Assessment Program	Penelope Lancaster	producer, arranger, pianist, sound recordist	Ballet	ADV	4 CD		
1998	New Zealand Choral Music	Auckland University Festival Choir, conductor Peter Godfrey	chorister	Classical Choral	Kiwi Pacific Records International Ltd	CD	SLD-108	Recorded after 1972 world tour
1994	The Adventures of Priscilla, Queen of the Desert	Guy Gross	choral arranger	Film score	Polydor	CD	731451693724	Won Oscar
1993	Seven Deadly Sins	Martin Armiger	arranger, keyboardist	TV	ABC Music	CD	EAN = 9399051446327	
1992	Frauds	Guy Gross, Stephan Elliott	orchestrator, arranger, conductor, composer additional music	Film score	Mushroom	CD	9398601009920	Victorian Philharmonic Orchestra
1990	The Crossing (Album)	Martin Armiger	orchestrator, conductor, composer additional music	Film score	Regular	CD Album	EAN = 9399609333628	
1990	The Crossing (Single)	Martin Armiger	orchestrator, conductor, composer additional music	Film score	Regular	CD Single	EAN = 9399609333628	Nature Boy (Kate Ceberano)
1990	Vince & Grace (Come in Spinner)	Martin Armiger	arranger, conductor	TV	ABC TV	DVD	ASIN B00D09B3FE	
1990	Vince & Grace (Come in Spinner)	Martin Armiger	arranger, conductor	TV	ABC Music	CD	ASIN B013Q7JS9C	Multi Platinum sales
1989	Torvill and Dean – Here We Stand	Kevin Stanton	choir arranger, pianist	Vocal	Laser Records	CD		Recalled by the duo on their website (1989)
1989	Torvill and Dean – Here We Stand	Kevin Stanton	choir arranger, pianist	Vocal	Hammard	CD	HAM 196	Recalled by the duo on their website (1989)
1988	Manning Clark's History of Australia – The Musical	Martin Armiger	arranger, orchestrator, musician	Musical theatre	Polydor	Vinyl LP	835 591–1	Based on Manning Clark's historical texts
1981	Aloha, A Spectacular New Musical – Original Cast	Eaton Magoon Jr, Robert Helpmann	musical director, conductor, arranger, orchestrator	Musical theatre	Hawaiian	Vinyl LP	HOS-101; Shortcode = rl942	Producer Carl Doy
1972	New Zealand Composer Edition	Auckland University Festival Choir, conductor Peter Godfrey	chorister	Classical Choral	Kiwi	Vinyl LP	SLD-31	World Tour 1972

== Honours and recognition ==
- 1973 – Hollinrake Memorial Prize, University of Auckland
- 1974 – Senior Scholarship in Music, University of Auckland
- 1977 – Fellow, Trinity College London (FTCL)
- 1999 – Nominated for Best Adult Contemporary Album at ARIA Music Awards of 1999
- 2024 – Elected Presidium Board Member, Richard Wagner Verband International
- 2025 – Honorary Member, Music Arrangers Guild of Australia
