= Bruce Mansfield =

Australian broadcaster (1944–2016)

- Born: 24 April 1944
- Died: 17 April 2016 (aged 71)
- Occupations: Radio and television presenter; Narrator
- Years active: 1960–2013
- Employer: 3AW
- Known for: IMT; Perfect Match Australia; Eyewitness News; Good Morning Australia; Rove Live
- Spouse: Jill Mansfield
- Children: 3

Bruce Mansfield (24 April 1944 – 17 April 2016) was an Australian television/radio personality and narrator.

== Early career ==
Mansfield began in radio at age 16, when he won a junior announcer's competition at the 3UZ radio station in 1960. The prize was 100 pounds ($200) and a week on-air. He then joined 3KZ in 1962 as a panel operator and late night announcer. In 1964 he joined 3XY presenting the mid-morning program.

In 1968, he moved to television and appeared on Graham Kennedy's In Melbourne Tonight on the Nine Network's Melbourne station, GTV-9. He was also known for his portrayal of the Chinese Superman on Channel 9's Cartoon Corner.

== Newsreading ==
Mansfield's television career then took a different direction in 1974 when he joined the Ten Network Melbourne ATV-0 as chief newsreader on Eyewitness News. In 1979, Mansfield and his news reading partner Annette Allison were reassigned to other roles at the station. Mansfield went on to become a voice-over announcer at ATV and also a participant on game shows such as Personality Squares. He was also the announcer for Channel Ten's long-running dating show Perfect Match Australia.

== Return to radio ==
=== Breakfast show ===
Mansfield co-hosted (with John Blackman) the breakfast program on 3AW as the alter-ego "Uncle Roy". The pair dominated Melbourne breakfast radio for several years before Blackman departed to rival station 3AK in 1986. Mansfield continued in the role at 3AW with Darren James until the station changed from "Personality Radio" to "Thinking Person's Radio" and the pair were dropped.

Both Mansfield and James were picked up by 3AK in 1989. The program lasted until the middle of 1990 when 3AK was taken over by new management. He then became presenter of the drive-time program on community radio station 3INR-FM, broadcasting from the Melbourne suburb of Heidelberg.

=== Remember When and Nightline ===
In 1990, Mansfield joined another TV veteran, Philip Brady, to present the Sunday night nostalgia program Remember When on 3AW. Six months later they also took over the Nightline program on a caretaker basis, but went on to stay as the program's full-time presenters; a role they continued until Mansfield's death.

Later in the 1990s, Mansfield made a return to television introducing late night movies and also hosting an infomercial program, Mansfield's Melbourne, on Channel 31 in Melbourne.

In 1999, Mansfield was sacked from 3AW over allegations that he gave on-air interviews in exchange for free goods and services, in a later development in the cash-for-comment investigations conducted by the then Australian Broadcasting Authority. He went on to present an afternoon program, Mansfield's Melbourne, on 3AK in 2000, before returning to his former role as Nightline and Remember When co-host on 3AW in 2001.

== Bert Newton and Rove ==
Mansfield featured as a contributor on Bert Newton's Good Morning Australia, presenting a segment called "Collectables", a nostalgia-related segment. In 2004, Mansfield did the voice-overs for a segment on Rove Live called "Who's in the Swivel Chair?"

== Awards ==
In 2003, Mansfield, with on-air partner, Philip Brady, won the Australian Commercial Radio Award for Best Networked Program (Nightline).

== Community work ==
Mansfield was an Australia Day ambassador in Victoria. On Australia Day, ambassadors go to various Victorian communities to spread the message of national pride, participate in local activities and give a short speech on what being Australian means to them.

In March 2013, Mansfield agreed to become an ambassador for the Northern Health Foundation, with a focus on the foundation's bequest program. Northern Health is one of Victoria's busiest public health services.

== Death ==
On 17 April 2016, 3AW announced that Mansfield had died that morning from prostate cancer. He was one week away from turning 72.
