= Calma Carmona =

Puerto Rican singer

- Born: Myraida Desireé Carmona Díaz
- Origin: Bayamón, Puerto Rico
- Genres: Latin Soul, soul
- Occupation: Singer-songwriter
- Instrument: Vocals
- Years active: 2013–present
- Label: There's No Other Girl
- Website: www.calmacarmona.com

Myraida Desireé Carmona Díaz, publicly known by the stage name Calma Carmona, is a Puerto Rican singer-songwriter whose music is primarily soul & Latin soul with influences that cross between Sade Adu, Santana, PJ Harvey, La Lupe and Tina Turner. She sings in both English and her native Spanish.

In August 2013, Carmona was voted MTV Iggy Artist of the week. In the same year, she opened for Beyoncé's The Mrs. Carter Show World Tour in Puerto Rico. She is known for her "wide-ranging influences", singing in the vocals style of Jill Scott and Erykah Badu. She released her debut EP, There's No Other Girl, in September 2013 on mun2.

In 2015, Carmona was hired by Gravity Thinking to sing the Franz Ferdinand track Love Illumination for the Glenfiddich 21-year-old whiskey campaign. She was accompanied in the track by the Scottish Opera Orchestra with music arranged and conducted by Derek Williams. The YouTube version of the recording amassed over 1.7 million hits in its premiere run.

== Discography ==
Albums and Singles

- 100 Vidas – album and single (2017)
- Presentiment – EP (2015)
- Dancing in the Dark – album (2015)
- Bag of Bones – single (2014)
- I Got Life – single (2014)
- There's No Other Girl Live Session – EP (2013)

Top Songs
