= Juan Matteucci =

Chilean & New Zealand conductor (1920–90)

Juan Matteucci OBE
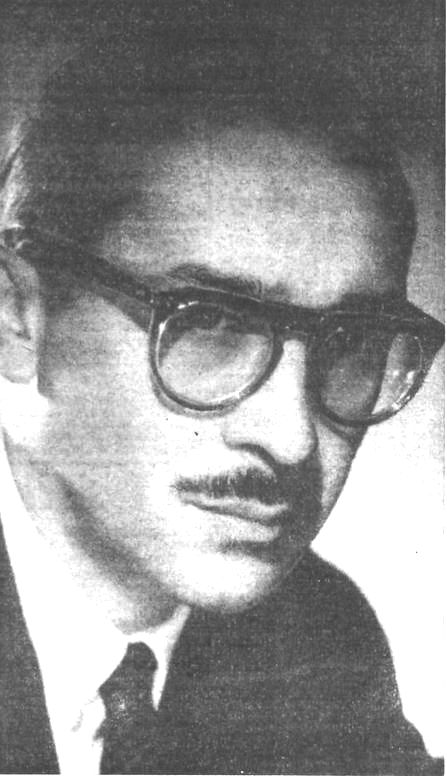

Background information
- Born: February 9, 1920; Faenza, Italy
- Died: 13 October 1990 (aged 70) Auckland, New Zealand
- Occupation: conductor
- Years active: 1940–1990
- Spouse: Connie Matteucci

Juan Matteucci OBE (9 February 1920 – 13 October 1990) was a Chilean and New Zealand conductor who was resident conductor of the NZBC Symphony Orchestra (now the New Zealand Symphony Orchestra) from 1964 to 1969, and the Symphonia of Auckland (now the Auckland Philharmonia) from 1969 to 1980.

== Early life and education ==
Juan Matteucci was born in 1920 in Faenza, Italy in the dressing room of an opera house where his father Amilcare Matteucci was playing in the orchestra and his mother was attending a performance. His family moved from Italy to Chile and he gained a bachelor's degree in philosophy, biology and maths before attending medical school for four years, while studying the cello. He dropped medicine in favour of studying music full time. Speaking to the New Zealand Listener soon after immigrating, Mattuecci recalled:

My father left Italy because he was anti-Fascist. I went to Peru, to Lima, as first cellist of the orchestra, and teacher at the Conservatoire. I played my first solo recital at the age of eight, and at 10, appeared with the Symphony Orchestra of Lima. Then my father was asked to be the first cellist of the Symphonic Orchestra of Chile, and we went into Chile, and I worked on my music at the Conservatoire in Santiago.

== Career ==
At the age of 20 Matteucci became principal cellist with the Symphony Orchestra of Chile, taking over his father's position in the orchestra. At this time, he studied conducting under Fritz Busch when he was a guest conductor of the orchestra. Matteucci began conducting and won a scholarship from the Chilean government to study at the Conservatorio Giuseppe Verdi in Milan. The chief conductor in charge of the course was Antonio Guarnieri, who was aided by Antonio Votto and Carlo Maria Giulini.

Between 1951 and 1964, Matteucci was assistant conductor and then conductor of the Philharmonic Orchestra of Chile and a Professor of the History of Art at a university in Chile from 1942 to 1948. He was appointed the sixth resident conductor of the NZBC Symphony Orchestra in 1964 holding the position until 1969, the first conductor to have a five year contract. During his time as conductor he, with the New Zealand Broadcasting Corporation's Head of Music, recruited players from Europe, North, South and Central America to increase the size of the orchestra. After previous British or British-trained conductors he introduced more operatic repertoire, and brought a fresh approach and innovations to the orchestra such as making its first appearance on television.

In 1969 Matteucci began an 11-year stint as conductor of the Symphonia of Auckland (which later became the Auckland Philharmonia); the orchestra's voluntary liquidation in 1980 was attributed partly to Matteucci's "imprudent programming". He also conducted the Christchurch Symphony Orchestra, the New Zealand Ballet and was musical director of Auckland Mercury Opera. He conducted orchestras in other countries: Symphony West in Provo, Utah; the Utah Symphony in Salt Lake City for Utah Opera Company productions; the Queensland Symphony Orchestra and Melbourne Symphony Orchestra in Australia; the Victoria Symphony Orchestra in Canada; in China and the USSR.

Matteucci also mentored younger conductors and in 1976, he approached the director of the New Zealand School of Music, Derek Williams to establish what became the first non-university tertiary level course for conductors in the Southern Hemisphere. Williams was also a course participant. This made the front page of the Auckland Star, featuring women conductors, who were at that time still a rarity. One such participant was Alexandra Wiltshire who went on to become the first woman to conduct a major opera in New Zealand. Wiltshire later was a conductor of the Australian production of Cats at Theatre Royal, Sydney, for which Williams was also a keyboardist, for several hundred performances. In 1977, the New Zealand School of Music announced a new Orchestral Training Scheme to be headed by Matteucci and staffed by section leaders of the Symphonia, however this was shelved after funding failed to materialise.

== Discography ==
Year	Title	Genre	Label	Refs.
1967	Kiri te Kanawa – Kiri Sings Opera	Opera	Kiwi LC46	
1968	Aotearoa (overture) (1940) ; Third symphony (1961) / Douglas Lilburn. Symphony no. 1 (1959) / David Farquhar.	Orchestral	Kiwi SLD-14	
1969	Ashley Heenan, Jenny McLeod, David Farquhar, Edwin Carr – Youth And Music	Orchestral	Kiwi SLC-72	
unknown	Respighi: Three Botticelli Pictures, Haydn: Symphony no. 89 in F major / The Symphonia Of Auckland conducted by Juan Matteucci	Orchestral	Phillips 6503003	
1974	Mews, Douglas : Joshua ; concerto for trombone and orchestra	Orchestral	SOUNZ MSDT-0139-2	
1974	Mahler, Gustave, 1860-1911: 8th Symphony / performed by NZBC Orchestra, Orpheus Choir, Auckland Choral Union, and Wellington Girls' College	Choral	Cassette MSC-023612	

== Honours and awards ==
Matteucci received an OBE in the 1975 Queen's Birthday Honours for services to music. He was a Knight of the Order of Merit of the Republic of Italy.

== Personal life ==
In 1961, Matteucci married his wife Connie (Constance), and they had four children. Away from the podium, in his younger years, Matteucci enjoyed mountaineering, yachting and fishing. He was an avid reader, counting New Zealand writer Dame Ngaio Marsh among his favourites. He also acted as New Zealand's Honorary Consul of Chile.

An avowed "80-a-day" smoker, Matteucci was rarely seen without a cigarette, and in August 1977 he suffered a heart attack forcing organisers of the Mobil Song Quest to search for a replacement conductor for the Finals. William Southgate was approached and conducted in Matteucci's stead.

Matteucci died 13 years later in New Zealand on 13 October 1990.
