= Debbie Newsome =

Australian TV presenter

- Born: 1960 (age 65–66)
- Spouses: Robert Pavlovic (divorced); Mark Learmonth
- Children: 2

Debbie Newsome (born 1960) is an Australian singer and former television personality, best known as the co-host with Greg Evans of the reality dating show Perfect Match.

== Biography and career ==
Newsome is a mother of two (Tara Pavlovic & Troy Pavlovic) from her former husband, Bob Pavlovic. She is now married to Mark Learmonth, and lives in Central Coast, New South Wales, Australia. Newsome is best known for her role as a co-host on Perfect Match

In 1989, Newsome launched the 'Debbie Newsome Show', produced by Dee Lampe, initially partnering with New Zealand singer Lou Pihama at the North Sydney Leagues Club with Derek Williams as arranger and musical director, before touring New South Wales with Williams and his 8 piece showband. This marked her transition from the screen to the stage, and she now works as a singer, performing a Janis Joplin tribute show. Newsome also appeared in the James Bond movie For Your Eyes Only.

In July 2017, Newsome was interviewed by Craig Bennett on Network Ten in a recap of her Perfect Match Australia days. Her daughter, Tara has appeared on many Reality TV shows like Bachelor in Paradise, The Bachelor and All Star Family Feud.

== Discography ==
=== Singles ===
List of singles, with Australian chart positions
Year	Title	Peak chart positions
Year	Title	AUS
1979	"What's Your Name, What's Your Number?"	100
