= Derek Watson (actor and musicologist) =

Scottish actor and musicologist (1948–2018)

Derek Watson (6 November 1948 – 17 September 2018) was a Scottish musicologist, actor, musician and bookseller. He has been described as a Scottish cultural icon.

== Acting career ==
Watson began work at the Citizens Theatre in 1972. He was initially brought into the company as the musical director of the 1972 Christmas panto. It was a position he would hold until his retirement in the process becoming affectionately known "Uncle Derek". After appearing on the Citz stage in non-speaking roles, his first speaking role was in Bertolt Brecht's Puntila and his Servant Matti. He went on to appear in more than 60 shows.

== Music and writings ==
Watson composed his first piece, a symphonic poem entitled The Battle of Bannockburn at the age of eight. He was sent to piano lessons, and by the time he was 11 had composed his second symphonic poem, The Romans in Britain. He was a music graduate of Edinburgh University and the Royal Academy of Music, London.

Watson contributed two volumes to the Master Musicians series of books. These were tomes on Anton Bruckner in 1975, and Franz Liszt in 1989. In 1979 he also wrote a major biography of Richard Wagner. To mark the 2003 Scottish Opera production of Der Ring des Nibelungen Watson wrote a version of the story for children.

== The Wagner Society of Scotland ==
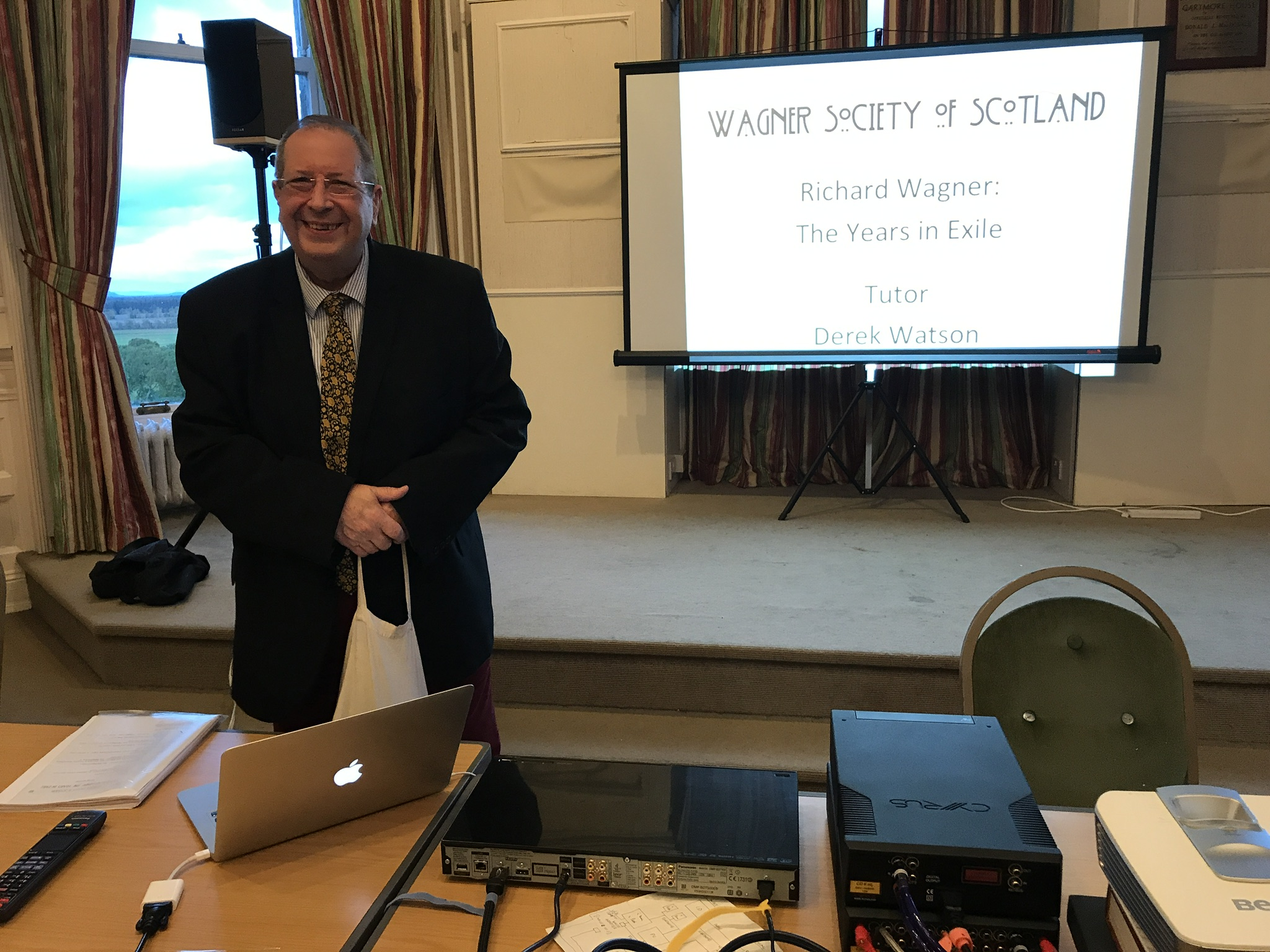
Wagner Society of Scotland founder Derek Watson teaching a course for the Society at Gartmore House in 2017

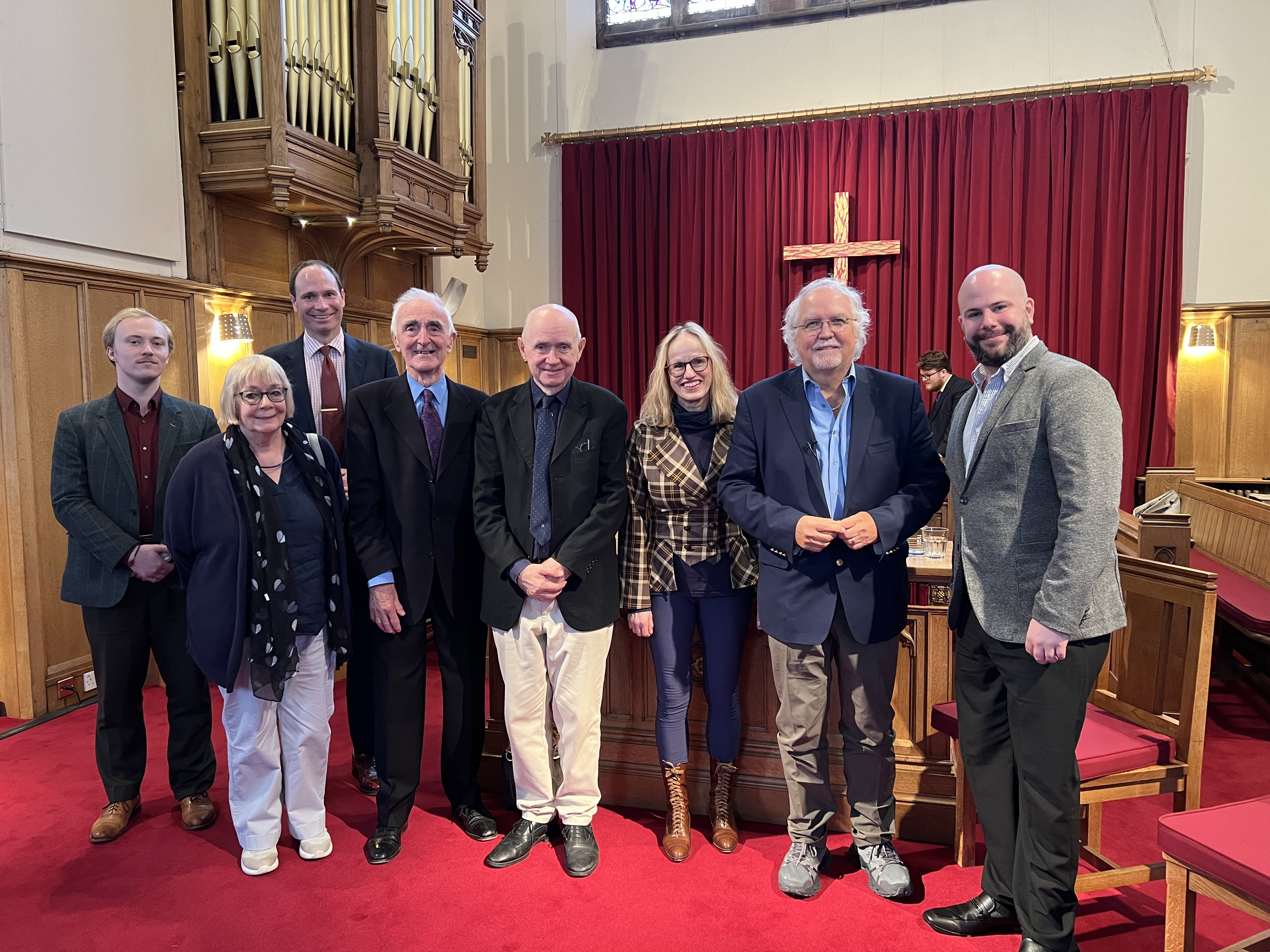
From WSoS Committee L>R:
R. Brady, C. Proudfoot, T. Gould, J. Anderton, D. Williams, S. Liles with Donald Runnicles and Thomas Lehman at Greenbank Parish Church 2024
(C. Massimo at rear)

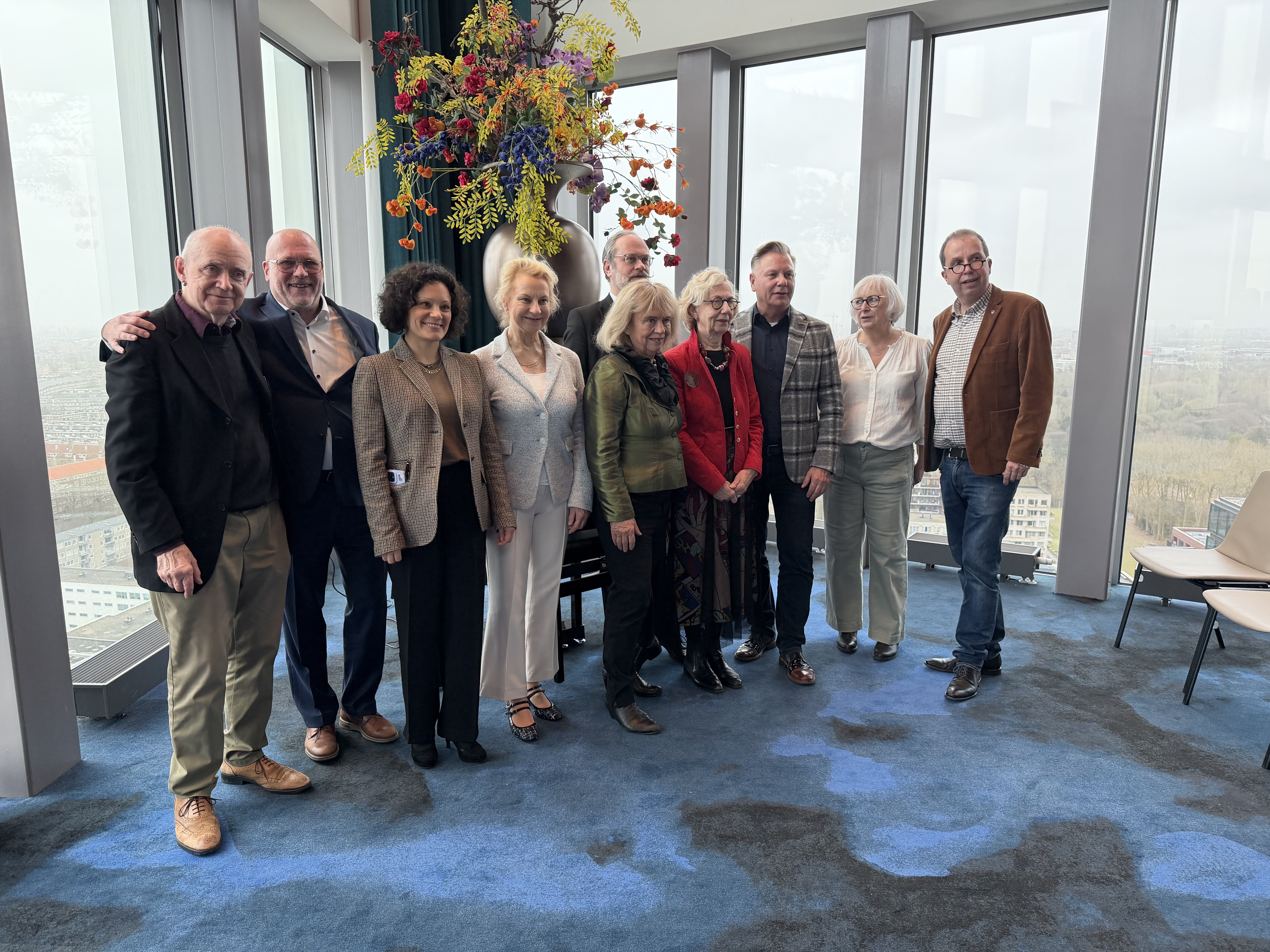
Board members of the RWVI L>R: D. Williams, M. Schmidt, E. Lobato, K. Colpan, C. Plante, S. Guðmundsdóttir, A. Vermeer-Janse, H. Leutscher (President), E. Mollard, T. Winiarski at 2026 Assembly, nhow Amsterdam RAI.

In 1984, Watson was the prime mover in the foundation of what was then the Scottish branch of the London Wagner Society. As its chairman, Watson oversaw a declaration of independence in 1996 that saw the local organisation become the Wagner Society of Scotland. He remained as the chairman until 2013, when he was succeeded in the post by Dale Bilsland until 2017, when Derek Williams was elected Chair.

Watson delivered study courses annually for the Society on the life and works of Richard Wagner at Gartmore House until his death. The courses were continued thereafter at Gartmore by broadcaster David Nice until the COVID-19 pandemic forced the organisation to move the courses online indefinitely.

The Wagner Society of Scotland acts as patron for a variety of Wagner-related enterprises and as a member of the International Association of Wagner Societies, annually awards a scholarship to a successful applicant to visit the Bayreuth Festival under the auspices of the Richard Wagner Scholarship Foundation. At the 2024 Assembly of Delegates at Deutsche Oper Berlin, the Society's Chair, Derek Williams was elected to serve a 5-year term on the RWVI Presidium. He has presented lectures on The Third Reich, Wahnfried, Siegfried Wagner and the Christianity of Richard Wagner for the Scottish Society.

The Society's Patron is Scottish conductor, Sir Donald Runnicles. On 24 August 2024, the day after his Bruckner-Mahler concert at the Usher Hall during the Edinburgh International Festival conducting the BBC Scottish Symphony Orchestra, with baritone Thomas Lehman, Runnicles and Lehman presented a live performance and interview for the Society at the Runnicles family's parish, Greenbank Parish Church.

== Bookshop proprietor ==
In 1994, having been a resident in West Linton for a decade, Watson opened Linton Books. Once he had retired from the theatre, the shop provided him with an alternative stage, ‘playing’ the proprietor of the shop to entertain customers. Book signings by authors included Alexander McCall Smith, whose second novel in the Sunday Philosophy Club series, Friends, Lovers, Chocolate, published in 2005, found the book's heroine Isabel Dalhousie visiting Watson in his capacity as bookseller. The shop itself featured during the unravelling of the story's mystery.

== Death ==
Watson died in the Edinburgh Royal Infirmary after a brief illness. In November 2019, a memorial event was held for him at the Òran Mór, Glasgow. Watson is survived by his partner, Will Scott.
