= Frauds (film) =

- Theatrical release poster
- Directed by: Stephan Elliott
- Written by: Stephan Elliott
- Produced by: Andrena Finlay; Stuart Quin
- Starring: Phil Collins; Hugo Weaving; Josephine Byrnes
- Cinematography: Geoff Burton
- Edited by: Brian Kavanagh
- Music by: Guy Gross
- Distributed by: Roadshow Films
- Release date: 4 June 1993 (UK)
- Running time: 90 minutes
- Country: Australia
- Language: English
- Box office: A$29,740 (Australia)

Frauds is a 1993 Australian thriller comedy film written and directed by Stephan Elliott and starring Phil Collins, Hugo Weaving and Josephine Byrnes. The film focuses on Roland Copping (Collins), a sociopathic insurance investigator who blackmails a married couple (Weaving and Byrnes) about the accidental killing of their friend during a prank gone wrong. It was selected to compete for the Palme d'Or at the 1993 Cannes Film Festival.

== Plot ==
A boy named Roland Copping is celebrating his eighth birthday, where his mother gives him a pair of dice that belonged to his father. Roland and his brother Matthew make a raft, and Roland tells Matthew to get on the raft after rolling the dice. Sending it on the river, Matthew jumps onto an overhead crane while the raft goes over a waterfall. Roland runs off to tell his mother, who runs onto the crane and grabs Matthew, but he slips and falls into the river, going over the waterfall.

Years later, the now-grown Roland is now an insurance investigator and a practical joker working in the fictional town of Andreas. Jonathan Wheats and his wife, Beth, a kindergarten teacher, host a party involving their friends Margaret and Michael. As a gift, Michael gives Jonathan and Beth two tickets to La Bohème. The next night, while Jonathan is at the opera house, Beth, forgetting about the show as she was supposed to meet Jonathan at the opera house immediately after work, comes home to find the house trashed. She finds a burglar stealing a set of silver Georgian cutlery and trying to escape, and he pursues her with a knife. In defense, Beth fires a crossbow at the burglar, impaling him through the heart. The burglar takes off his mask, revealing himself to be Michael, who was trying to prank her.

Beth is held on trial, where the judge rules Michael's death as an accident, and acquits Beth for self-defense. 6 months later, Beth and Jonathan make a phony claim for compensation money for their stolen cutlery. Roland pays a visit to the Wheats' residence and interviews Jonathan about Michael's death. It is revealed that Michael had an accomplice waiting in a getaway car, and after Michael was killed, the accomplice took off. As Roland leaves to process the claims, Jonathan asks if they'll see him again, to which he flips one of the dice and confirms that they will. Jonathan then pulls back the curtain and sees Roland standing across the street, flipping the dice and staring at him.

One month later, Roland visits the Wheats again to interview Beth, interrupting a game of Twister, and annoying Beth with his constant rolling of the dice. Roland explains that the dice belonged to his father, who was a war hero, and that they hold a certain magical quality. When Jonathan asks what relevance they hold to the case, Roland flips the dice to decide whether he should continue the conversation tonight or do it tomorrow. When the die lands, he decides to continue the conversation tomorrow, but not before giving them a piece of their stolen forks, and then proclaiming that he will retrieve it tomorrow, as "new evidence requires a new search".

The next morning, Roland arrives and approves their claim. After going through the steps of the killing, he reveals that Jonathan is the accomplice. Furious and disbelieving him, the Wheats throw him out of the house, but Roland throws a fork at Jonathan, revealing the one he gave them the last night to be a perfect forgery, telling Jonathan he should not have checked his hiding spot. Horrified, Jonathan runs into the shed in the backyard and rips through the hiding spot: a model of the Battle of Austerlitz, only to find the fork is not there. As a shocked Beth follows him inside, Jonathan tells her to close the door, revealing a safe on the back of the door; the safe contains the stolen silver cutlery.

Jonathan confesses that he stole the cutlery because Beth spent half of her life surrounded by bills she could not afford. They call Roland and tell him to meet up at their house. He demands money in exchange for his silence, and so they pay him. Instead of telling the police about the fraud, Roland decides to pull childish pranks on them, including taking the set of cutlery, sending an insurance agent to inspect their car, mailing the crossbow used to kill Michael, and decorating a Christmas tree inside their house with the stolen cutlery and the words "steal me"; this causes Beth to vomit all over the police detective who arrived at her house to investigate.

Meanwhile, Jonathan locates Roland's house and goes inside, accidentally activating a secret passage that takes him into a funhouse-style hideout. He accidentally activates some traps, including one that sets loose Roland's pet goose Cesar. Jonathan prepares to escape just as Roland returns. After discovering Jonathan has been to his hideout, Roland leaves, and Jonathan escapes and follows Roland to a mental asylum called Glendale Clinic, where his brother Matthew is revealed to have survived going over the waterfall, but has become vegetative and quadraplegic.

Finally realizing Roland's weakness, Jonathan begs for two days to beat Roland at his game, but Beth is ready to give up and call the police. They give Roland their car, and Beth calls Roland to meet up that night. At Roland's birthday party, Beth surrenders everything she owns in exchange for Roland leaving them alone, but he gives her the dice to roll. Beth snaps and admits that she's had enough of Roland and leaves, secretly stealing his dice. While calling Jonathan at a phone booth, Beth is kidnapped by Roland.

Roland calls Jonathan and tells him to arrive at his house, only to find he's already there. Roland threatens to send Beth down a slide into a spinning sawblade, and pulls a gun on Jonathan. Brandishing a phone, Jonathan dials Roland's phone number, revealing he has kidnapped Matthew and tied him up over a pool, and if he calls that number, Matthew will be dropped into the pool and drown. Furious, Roland asks Jonathan how he could do such a thing, as his brother is quadraplegic and mute, but Jonathan reveals that Matthew is actually not vegetative and can speak, as he confessed about their father never wanting to come home, and how he received his permanent injuries while trying to humor his brother. Jonathan gambles that if the die lands on half of the numbers, he and Beth can go free; Roland rolls the die and it lands on one of those numbers.

Refusing to accept defeat, Roland fights Jonathan and activates the button, sending Beth down the slide, but the sawblade recedes as she slides over it, crashing into Roland's convertible. In retaliation, Beth dials the number, sending Matthew into the water. Roland dives into the pool to rescue Matthew, but accidentally removes his head, revealing "Matthew" to actually be a replica. Roland screams in fury, having finally been defeated.

Finally having had enough, Beth calls the police while Jonathan rescues Roland from drowning. As they both look at "Matthew"'s floating head, Roland starts to laugh, and Jonathan starts to laugh as the police sirens are heard in the distance. As Beth walks away, she starts to laugh, too.

== Cast ==
- Phil Collins as Roland Copping
  - Mitchell McMahon as Young Roland Copping
- Hugo Weaving as Jonathan Wheats
- Josephine Byrnes as Beth Wheats
- Ian Cockburn as Matthew Copping
  - Andrew McMahon as Young Matthew Copping
- Rebel Penfold-Russell as Copping Mother (credited as Rebel Russell)
- Peter Mochrie as Michael Allen
- Helen O'Connor as Margaret
- Colleen Clifford as Mrs. Waterson
- Vincent Ball as Judge
- Gandhi MacIntyre as Cartel Valuer
- Christina Ormani as Telephone Girl
- Nicholas Hammond as Detective Simms
- Kee Chan as Detective Alan

== Production ==
The film was made by Latent Image Productions, a production company formed by Rebel Penfold-Russell, Andrena Finlay and Stuart Quin. Stephan Elliot wanted to use Phil Collins after seeing him in an episode of Miami Vice and contacted him through Finlay's husband, Al Clark, who used to work for Virgin Films, and was supported and financed through J&M executive Michael Ryan. Collins later recalled, "It's a great little film, and I was better in it (than in Buster)."

== Music ==
Music for the film was composed by Guy Gross, orchestrated and with additional music by Derek Williams. The score was performed by the Victorian Philharmonic Orchestra, conducted by Williams, recorded at Alan Eaton Studios, Melbourne. Additional music was recorded and mixed at Trackdown Digital. A soundtrack album was issued by Picture This Records. The album has since gone out of print.

== Reception ==
In 1994, Frauds grossed $29,740 at the box office in Australia (=c.$71,248 equivalent in 2026). The film was initially criticised for being "self-impressed by its own garishness" in the Los Angeles Times and for being "dramatically thin" in TV Guide. In a 2-and-a-half-star review, Rob Lowing of The Sun-Herald wrote, "This has all the colour and visual wit of a Tim Burton (Beetlejuice) comedy, but it's definitely light in the plot department. Pop singer Collins is deft as the dastardly Roland." User reviews on IMDb have been more positive over time, giving Frauds a 5.9/10 average score, while according to OZMovies, who themselves gave Frauds a 2-star rating, Who? Weekly had given Frauds a glowing review, saying, "This is sheer entertainment ... Collins steals the show". In Australia, the video version was released in 1994, and The Sydney Morning Herald opined that this was done in part to capitalize on the success of director Stephan Elliott's follow-up blockbuster, The Adventures of Priscilla, Queen of the Desert, which was released the same year.
