= Perfect Match (Australian game show) =

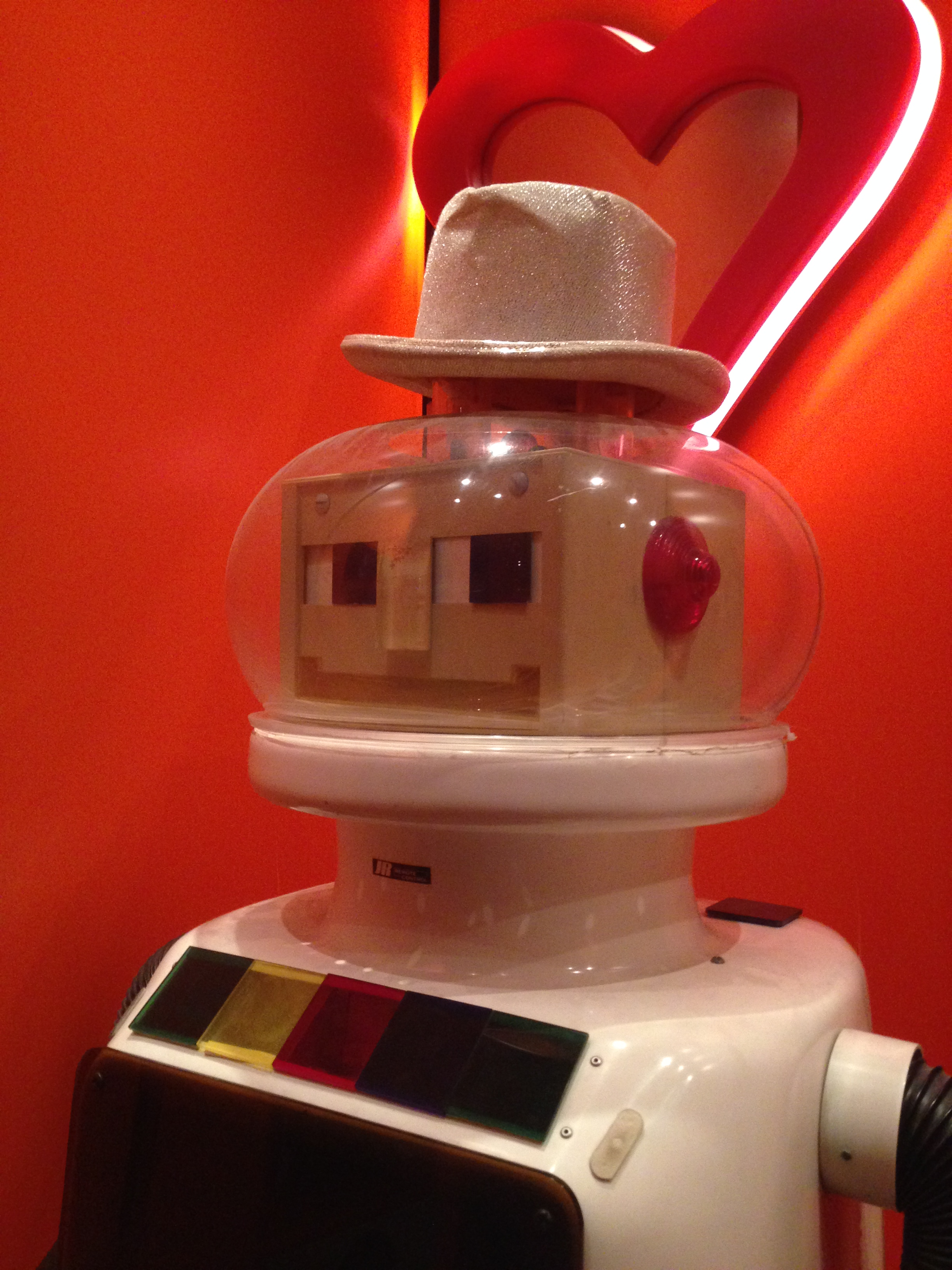
- "Dexter" the robot, from the 1980s series
- Genre: Dating game show
- Based on: The Dating Game by Chuck Barris
- Presented by: Greg Evans (1984–1986, mid 1988–1989); Cameron Daddo (1987–mid 1988); Shelley Craft (2002)
- Narrated by: Keith Scott (1984); Max Rowley (1984-88); Bruce Mansfield (1989); Ross Geddes (2002)
- Theme music composer: Rick Turk
- Country of origin: Australia
- Original language: English

Production
- Producer: Grundy
- Running time: 30 minutes (including commercials)

Original release
- Network: Network Ten
- Release: January 30, 1984 – November 17, 1989
- Network: Seven Network
- Release: 24 August 2002 – 2002

Perfect Match Australia is an Australian dating game show based on the format of the American game show The Dating Game. Perfect Match was produced by the Reg Grundy Organisation.

It originally aired on Network Ten for 30 minutes most weekdays from 5:30pm between 1984 and 1989. The format was revived in Australia for subsequent programs Blind Date based on its US counterpart on Network Ten in 1991, and again a revised version of Perfect Match this time airing on the Seven Network in 2002 premiering on 24 August.

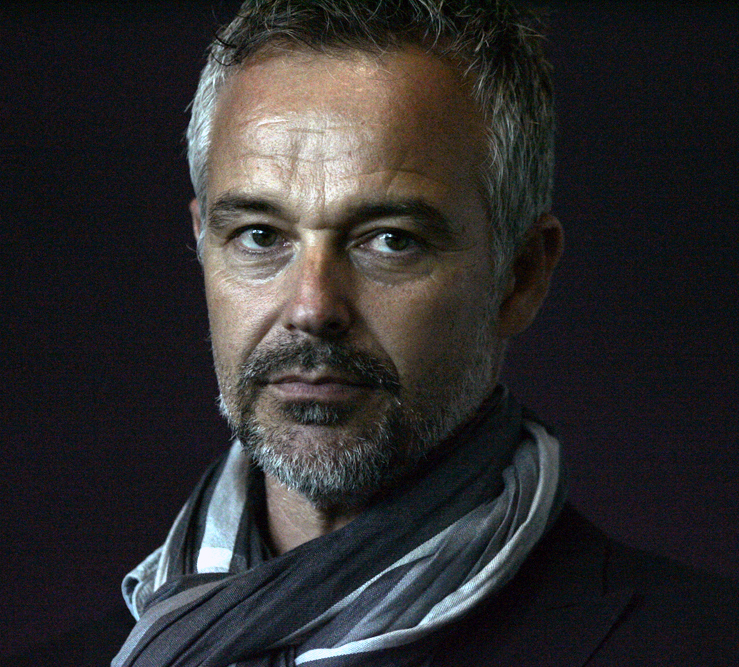
Host Cameron Daddo (1987–1988)

== Overview ==
The show featured the same format as international versions The Dating Game and Blind Date, with a contestant determining their "perfect match" by asking three potential suitors of the opposite sex hidden behind a screen a number of scripted compatibility questions. Each episode featured two different rounds. One featured a male asking questions of three unseen females, the other had one female asking questions of three male contestants. Viewers of the show could see all contestants throughout each round.

Frequently the questions—along with the answers contestants gave—aimed for comedy and were imbued with sly innuendo. After three questions the contestant would choose their preferred partner based on the answers they had given, and would then be revealed to the contestant, both the contestant and selected match, would then win the prize of a holiday to be taken together (along with a television crew). After this the partner with the highest "compatibility score", based on responses to interview questions prior to the game, specially calculated by a computerized robot called Dexter, would be revealed. If the contestant's selection had the highest "compatibility score", both the contestant and selected match won a bonus prize.

Each episode also included a recap of the holiday taken by an earlier couple. The segment included footage of their weekend away, along with edited highlights of video interviews with each individual in isolation after returning home, which would be played to the couple as they were interviewed together in the studio. Sometimes previously unrevealed true feelings would be revealed when the video interviews were replayed.

The Comedy Company character Kylie Mole once appeared on Perfect Match. Another Comedy Company character, Marika, Con the Fruiterer's long suffering wife, also made an appearance on Blind Date. WWF professional wrestler Paul Roma also made an appearance on Perfect Match.

== Hosts ==
Perfect Match Australia was hosted by Greg Evans for the first three years. Through an oversight, Channel Ten forgot to renew his contract, so he was signed by Channel Nine who "warehoused" him. Cameron Daddo replaced him as host of Perfect Match from 1987 to 1988. After Daddo left the series, Evans, whose contract with Nine had expired, returned to Network Ten as host for the final season. The show also featured hostesses Debbie Newsome (1984–85), Tiffany Lamb (1986) and Kerrie Friend (1987–89).

After an initial relaunch returning in 1991 now known under the UK title of Blind Date the show was again hosted by Greg Evans with Nicky Buckley serving as hostess. Craig Huggins was the announcer who recapped each contestant with quirky one-liners. Nicky Buckley was later replaced by Swedish-born model Ankie Nordberg. Again known under its original title of Perfect Match a brief 2002 revival was hosted by Shelley Craft and Agro. Radio broadcasters Max Rowley and Bruce Mansfield served as announcers.

The original series also featured Dexter – a "robot" that supposedly mathematically calculated the compatibility of the couple, voiced by Keith Scott. In the 2002 version, Agro partially fulfilled a similar role to Dexter in announcing the couples' compatibility scores.

== New Zealand version ==
A short-lived version hosted by Butch Bradley and Tiffany Baragwanath aired on TV3 from 1989 until 1990. It followed the same format as the Australian version.

== In other media ==
Evans appeared as himself on a parody version of the show called Perfect Date in the 1999 comedy film The Craic.

== See also ==
- List of Australian television series
