= Donald Runnicles =

Scottish conductor, born 1954

Sir Sir Donald Runnicles OBE HonFRSE
- Born: 16 November 1954 (age 71); Edinburgh, Scotland
- Occupation: conductor
- Years active: 1989–present
- Spouse: Adelle Eslinger Runnicles
- Website: donaldrunnicles.org

Sir Donald Cameron Runnicles (born 16 November 1954) is a Scottish conductor. Runnicles has served as music director of the San Francisco Opera, principal guest conductor of the Atlanta Symphony Orchestra, principal conductor of the Orchestra of St. Luke's, music director of the Grand Teton Music Festival, and chief conductor of the BBC Scottish Symphony Orchestra. He is currently Generalmusikdirektor of the Deutsche Oper Berlin and chief conductor of the Dresden Philharmonic.

== Career ==
Born in Edinburgh, Scotland, Donald Runnicles is the son of William Runnicles, a director of a furniture supply company and a choirmaster and organist, and Christine Runnicles. He began his education at George Heriot's School in Edinburgh, moving later to George Watson's College, which offered a specialised music education facility, followed by the University of Edinburgh and St John's College, Cambridge. He studied for a year at the London Opera Centre.

Runnicles began his operatic career as a singers' coach and assistant conductor in Mannheim, Germany. He became Generalmusikdirektor of the city of Freiburg, Germany in 1989, and held this post until 1993. Referring to the 10 years he spent in Germany, Runnicles has said

"I have to breathe this air, this Wagnerian air. It was life-changing and that love affair with Wagner led to what was influenced by him: the Bruckner, the Mahler."

Runnicles is patron of the Wagner Society of Scotland, a member of the International Association of Wagner Societies.

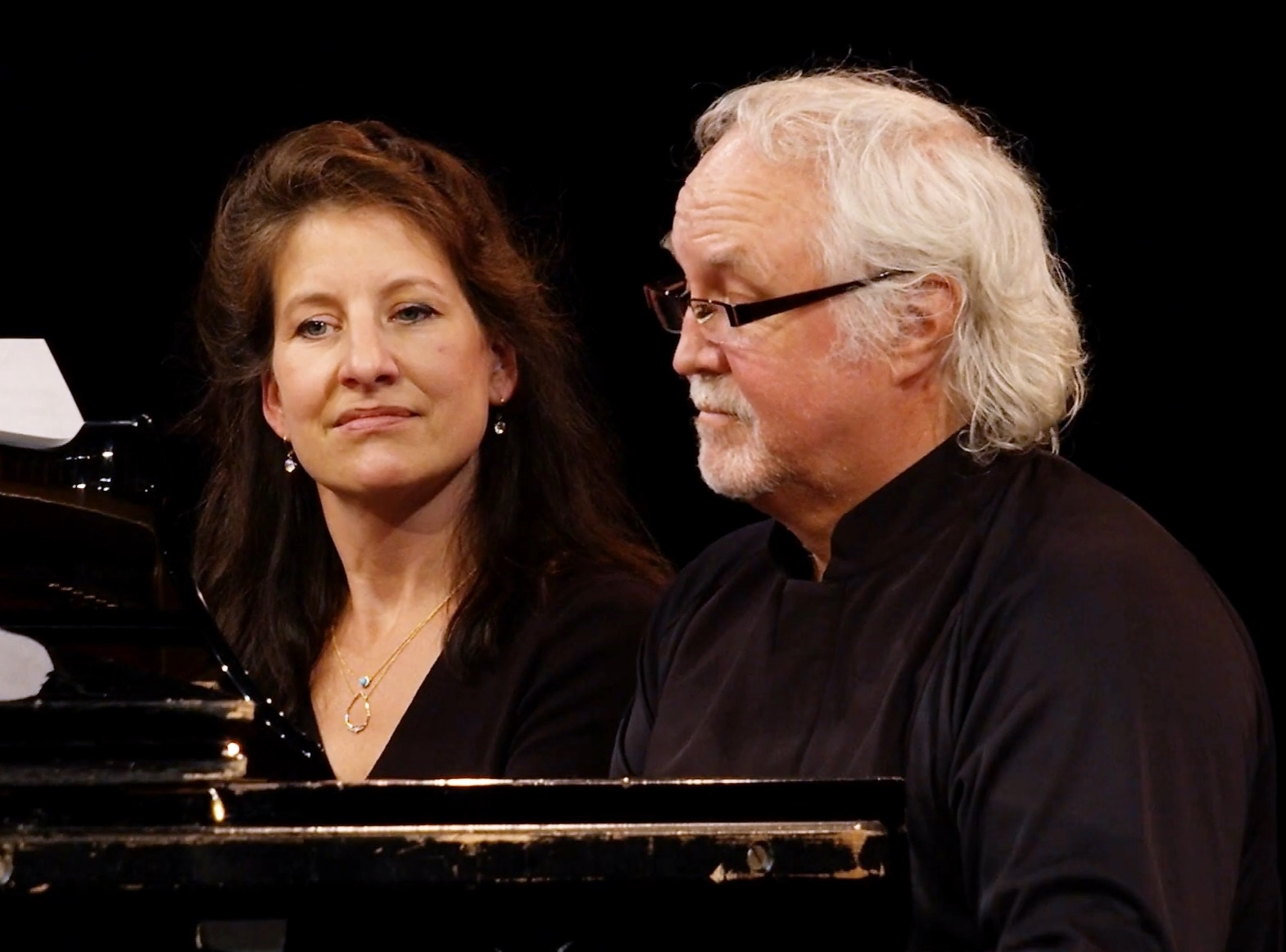
Adelle Eslinger-Runnicles and Donald Runnicles play four handed piano in 2020

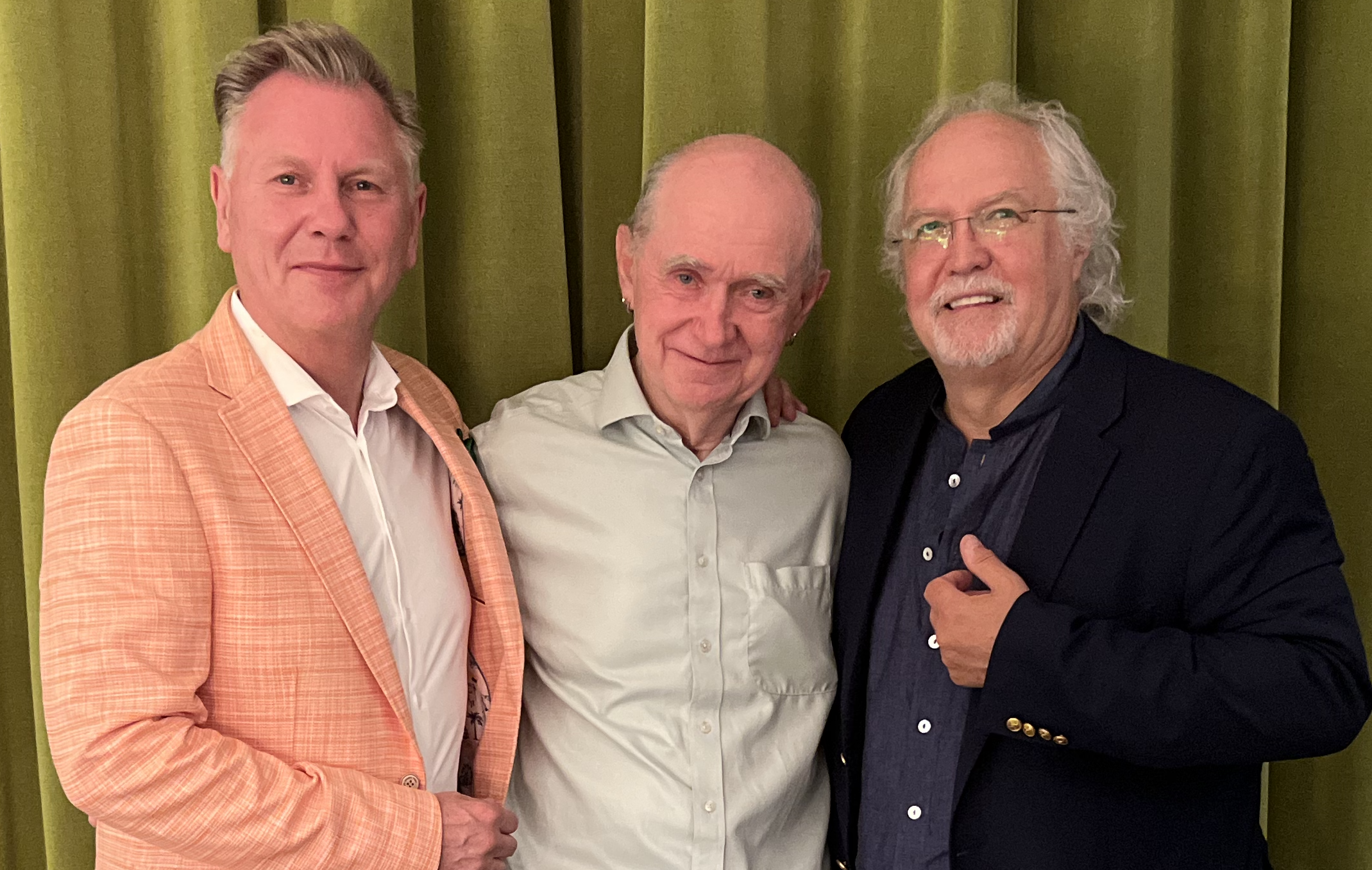
Harry Leutscher (L), President RWVI, Derek Williams - Chair Wagner Society of Scotland, Donald Runnicles in 2024.

at Deutsche Oper Berlin

In the US, Runnicles served as music director and principal conductor of the San Francisco Opera from 1992 to 2009. Runnicles was principal guest conductor of the Atlanta Symphony Orchestra from September 2001 through the 2021-2022 season. From 2001 to 2007, he was principal conductor of the Orchestra of St. Luke's. Runnicles had been offered the title of music director of the Orchestra of St. Luke's, but he declined the title. He became music director of the Grand Teton Music Festival in September 2005, having been appointed that August. His Grand Teton contract was extended through 2011, and subsequently to 2019.

Runnicles first conducted the BBC Scottish Symphony Orchestra (BBC SSO) in 2001. In October 2007, the BBC SSO announced the appointment of Runnicles as their next Chief Conductor in September 2009, for an initial contract of three years. The BBC SSO appointment marked Runnicles' first principal post with a British orchestra. In September 2011, the BBC SSO extended his contract as chief conductor through 2015. In October 2014, the orchestra reported the scheduled conclusion of Runnicles' tenure as chief conductor in September 2016. His final concert as the BBC SSO's chief conductor was on 28 August 2016, and he now has the title of Conductor Emeritus of the BBC SSO.

In October 2007, the Deutsche Oper Berlin announced the appointment of Runnicles as their next Generalmusikdirektor, effective August 2009, for an initial contract of five years. In December 2016, the company announced the newest extension of Runnicles' contract with the Deutsche Oper Berlin until 2022. In November 2020, the Deutsche Oper Berlin announced the most recent extension of Runnicles' contract as its GMD, through 2027. In September 2023, the Deutsche Oper Berlin announced that Runnicles is to stand down as its GMD at the close of the 2025–2026 season, one season earlier than the most recent contract extension, at Runnicles' own request.

In December 2022, Runnicles first guest-conducted the Dresden Philharmonic. In December 2023, the Dresden Philharmonic announced the appointment of Runnicles as its next chief conductor, effective with the 2025-2026 season. He served as chief conductor-designate for the 2024–2025 season.

== Personal life ==
Runnicles is married to the Canadian pianist Adelle Eslinger, Lady Runnicles. Runnicles has two daughters, Ashley and Tamara, from his previous marriage to South African violist Elizabeth Prior, as well as an older daughter, Alexandra, from a previous relationship.

== Honours and awards ==
Runnicles holds honorary doctorates from the University of Edinburgh and the Royal Scottish Academy of Music and Drama (conferred in February 2011). In 2019, Runnicles was elected an Honorary Fellow of the Royal Society of Edinburgh. Runnicles was knighted in the 2020 Birthday Honours for services to music.

== Selected discography ==
- Beethoven: Symphony No. 9, Atlanta Symphony Orchestra
- Bellini: I Capuleti e i Montecchi / Jennifer Larmore
- Britten: Peter Grimes / Metropolitan Opera DVD 2008
- Britten: Billy Budd / Bo Skovhus, Vienna Festival 2001.
- Britten: Sinfonia da Requiem / Elgar, Davies, Turnage
- Gluck: Orfeo ed Euridice (Berlioz version) / Jennifer Larmore, Dawn Upshaw, San Francisco Opera (SFO).
- Humperdinck: Hansel und Gretel / Larmore, Ziesak.
- Korngold: Die tote Stadt / Salzburg Festival 2004.
- MacMillan: Violin Concerto and Symphony No. 4/ BBC Scottish Symphony Orchestra, 2016.
- Mozart: Requiem / Levin Edition.
- Mozart: Symphony No. 39 and Symphony No. 41 "Jupiter" / Orchestra of St. Luke's, 2011.
- Orff: Carmina Burana / Hong, Atlanta.
- Puccini: Turandot / Éva Marton, Michael Sylvester. SFO. (DVD, Naxos Records)
- Strauss: Capriccio / Kiri Te Kanawa, Tatiana Troyanos, Director: Peter Maniura. SFO. (DVD)
- Strauss: Ein Heldenleben, and others / NDR SO Hamburg.
- Strauss: Four Last Songs; Wagner: Liebestod / Christine Brewer.
- Wagner: Tristan und Isolde / Brewer, Treleaven, Rose.
- Wagner: Wesendonck Lieder; Strauss: Four Last Songs; Alban Berg: Seven Early Songs / Jane Eaglen, London Symphony Orchestra
- Wagner: Arias, Wesendonck Lieder / Jonas Kaufmann, DO
- Wagner: Der Ring des Nibelungen / 'Orchestral Scenes', Dresden Staatskapelle
- Wallace: Harvey Milk / San Francisco Opera

Cultural offices
Preceded by Eberhard Kloke	Generalmusikdirektor, Philharmonisches Orchester Freiburg; 1989–1993	Succeeded by Johannes Fritzsch
Preceded by Sir John Pritchard	Music Director, San Francisco Opera; 1992–2009	Succeeded by Nicola Luisotti
Preceded by Sir Charles Mackerras	Principal Conductor, Orchestra of St. Luke's; 2001–2007	Succeeded by Pablo Heras-Casado
Preceded by Eiji Oue	Music Director, Grand Teton Music Festival; 2005–present	Succeeded by incumbent
Preceded by Renato Palumbo	Generalmusikdirektor, Deutsche Oper Berlin; 2009–2026	Succeeded by (post vacant)
Preceded by Ilan Volkov	Chief Conductor, BBC Scottish Symphony Orchestra; 2009–2016	Succeeded by Thomas Dausgaard
