= Frauds (soundtrack) =

Frauds Original Motion Picture Soundtrack

Soundtrack album by Guy Gross
- Released: 1993
- Genre: Film score
- Length: 56:15
- Label: Picture This Records
- Producer: Guy Gross

The soundtrack to the 1993 film Frauds, featuring Guy Gross's score, orchestrated and conducted by Derek Williams.

== Frauds: Original Motion Picture Soundtrack ==
1. "Roland's Suite" – 2:30
2. "I've Got You Under My Skin" – 2:12
3. "Waterfall" – 2:29
4. "Beth" – 1:31
5. "Jonathan" – 3:30
6. "Burglary" – 2:51
7. "Nightmare" – 2:34
8. "Accusation" – 4:56
9. "Confession" – 2:30
10. "Christmas Vomit" – 3:28
11. "House of Games" – 3:27
12. "Roland's Bedroom" – 3:45
13. "Toyland" – 3:44
14. "The Game Begins" – 3:06
15. "Roland Turns" – 4:15
16. "Matthew" – 2:37
17. "Finale" – 4:24
18. "Roland's Toy Piano" – 2:16

Tracks 1, 3-18 performed by the Victorian Philharmonic Orchestra
Track 2 performed by Marcia Hines and Bob Coassin's Big Band
All tracks orchestrated and conducted by Derek Williams[2][3]

| Composer       = Guy Gross
| Conductor      = Derek Williams
| Orchestrator   = Derek Williams
| Format         = CD
| EAN            = 9398601009920
