= SOUNZ =

New Zealand

- Founded: 1991
- Type: Charitable Incorporated Organisation
- Purpose: Promotion of New Zealand music; Support for composers; Publishing New Zealand music; Information centre
- Location: Wellington, New Zealand
- Website: sounz.org.nz

SOUNZ The Centre for New Zealand Music (Māori: Toi te Arapūoru) is a music information centre in New Zealand dedicated to fostering the creation, performance, recording and broadcasting of New Zealand music, publishing music and providing information for and about performers, composers, teachers, broadcasters and the music industry.

== History ==
SOUNZ was founded in 1991 by the Queen Elizabeth II Arts Council (now Creative New Zealand) after a report recommending the promotion of New Zealand music and composers. Its mission was "to foster and promote New Zealand music, its creation, performance, publication, recording and broadcast by working with and on behalf of New Zealand composers." This included promoting New Zealand music internationally as New Zealand composers were rarely heard outside the country. In 2007 the mission was "Created in New Zealand, heard around the world! Tipua i Aotearoa, rangona e te ao!." The Centre is registered as a charitable trust.

The Centre maintains a collection of music scores and recordings for loan and purchase and provides information to a wide range of people and organisations such as universities, choirs, orchestras and museums. In 2006 the Centre was answering about 2000 queries a year. The Centre is also a retailer selling CDs, scores, books and other material which is often not available elsewhere.

In the early 2000s composers were changing the ways they created their works with technology allowing collaboration and dissemination of their music, and it was acknowledged that New Zealand music could be better promoted in an online environment. From 2006 to 2007 in response to these changes in technology SOUNZ developed its website and online resources; SOUNZ Online was launched in 2007. The Online project involved digitising scores, creating sample recordings, and building a new catalogue of music with an enhanced search function which linked information about works, scores, recordings, events and performances with composers and performers. Works are held by the Centre and on its database if "the work has been or is about to be performed, broadcast, or recorded by an established or recognised solo artist, ensemble or performing organisations."

From 2020 to 2021 SOUNZ developed its Moana Pacific Peoples Musics Strategy to foster the music of Pacifica peoples.

=== Partnerships ===
SOUNZ has collaborated with a number of different musical and cultural organisations: the Composers Association of New Zealand; APRA, Creative New Zealand; the Big Sing (organised by the New Zealand Choral Federation); the School Music Contest (organised by Chamber Music New Zealand); the New Zealand Symphony Orchestra (NZSO), RNZ and New Zealand On Air the Auckland Philharmonia Orchestra, Orchestra Wellington, Christchurch Symphony Orchestra and Dunedin Symphony Orchestra. Internationally SOUNZ has worked with the Australian Music Centre and has been a member of the International Association of Music Information Centres (IAMIC) since 1993.

== Activities ==
From the early 1990s SOUNZ mounted a number of activities to promote music. SOUNZ Orchestral took place in 1993 and SOUNZ Choral in 1994, both in Auckland. The choirs performing at SOUNZ Choral recorded the CD New Zealand Choral Music Vol. One. In 1995 SOUNZ Youth was held in Christchurch for performers under 25 presenting music by NZ composers.

SOUNZ has supported music education with its SOUNZWrite resources to promote New Zealand music in schools. Ears Wide Open - Taringa Areare (2001) was developed for primary and intermediate schools along with guides for high school students studying for NCEA exams. Resource books were written by Cheryl Camm on Lullaby for Matthew by Gillian Whitehead, Aotearoa Overture by Douglas Lilburn, and I hope I never by Tim Finn.

By 2010, as further encouragement to New Zealand music in schools, SOUNZ sponsored composition prizes at the Big Sing, the national choral music contest for schools, and the NZCT School Music Contest. The prizes were awarded to new works by student composers. As at 2026 student composers are awarded two prizes in a collaboration with the New Zealand Choral Federation: NZCF-SOUNZ Choral Composition Competition and the SOUNZ-NZCF Te Reo Māori Choral Composition Award which was established in 2021 to support young composers to compose choral works in Māori.

A series of CDs of New Zealand music called SOUNZfine were produced between 1996 and 2004. These were disseminated to broadcasters overseas with the aim of exposing New Zealand music to an international audience.

The SOUNZ Contemporary Award / Te Tohu Auaha at the APRA Awards began in 1998 to acknowledge composers and is awarded to the best contemporary composition. The prize is $3000 and a trophy designed by artist Sarah Smuts-Kennedy.

The biannual NZSO-SOUNZ Readings commenced in 1998 to increase performances of New Zealand compositions with the NZSO playing works by established and emerging composers. In the first Readings the orchestra played works by David Hamilton, David Farquhar, Anthony Ritchie, Christopher Blake, Ross Harris, Dorothy Ker, Juliet Palmer, Penelope Axtens and John Elmsly. Although the Readings in 1998 were not recorded subsequent Readings have been recorded by RNZ. The Readings continued until 2011 and were succeeded by the New Zealand Composer Sessions with the NZSO continuing to workshop and play works which were then recorded by RNZ. By 2019 142 works by 67 composers had been recorded.

The SOUNZ Community Commission was established in 1999 to encourage composers and community groups to create and perform new works. The Commission has been funded by an anonymous sponsor since 2007.

In 2010 the Resound project was launched. Sixty years of Radio New Zealand recordings were digitised and made available for streaming. Since 2013 Resound has expanded to include videos of performances with the project managed by composer Chris Watson.

The Nicholas Tarling Charitable Trust has funded two of SOUNZ's initiatives. The SOUNZ Southern Jam Commission, launched in 2025, is for jazz composers to write new works which would subsequently be published by SOUNZ to encourage further performances. The SOUNZ Tarling Trust Orchestral Commission is a joint venture between the Trust, SOUNZ and the city orchestras of Auckland, Wellington, Christchurch and Dunedin.

Other activities include the SOUNZ Jazz Recording Project since 2020, the SOUNZ Commission for Orchestra and Sistema Youth Orchestra since 2018 and the SOUNZ Brass Composition Competition since 2016.

== Staff ==
As at 2026 the director is Hannah Darroch. Previous directors have been John Page, Scilla Askew, Nicholas McBryde Julie Sperring and Diane Marsh.

In 2022 SOUNZ appointed Tau’ili’ili Alpha Maiava as the Moana Pacific Musics Specialist / Kaiārahi, Ngā Puoro o Te Moananui-a-Kiwa. Toni Huata was the Director of Māori Music.

== Selected CDs ==
- SOUNZ fine: Fine music from New Zealand (1996)
- New Zealand compositions: Jenny McLeod, Helen Fisher, David Hamilton (1998)
- New Zealand compositions: Douglas Lilburn, Anthony Ritchie, Tim Finn, Eddie Rayner (1998)
- SOUNZ fine. Volume 2 (2000)
- SOUNZ fine. Volume 3 (2000)
- SOUNZ fine. Volume 4 (2000)
- SOUNZ fine. Volume 5 (2004) – women composers
- Sound barrier: music of New Zealand (2006)

== Selected publications ==
- Kōwhai (1994) – an album of songs by women composers inspired by suffrage centenary
- First Fifteen (1996) – 21 piano pieces by 15 composers
- Little Dancings: a selection of flute music by New Zealand composers (1998)
- Douglas Lilburn: Overture: Aotearoa / researched and written by Cheryl Camm (1998)
- Douglas Lilburn: Three sea changes / researched and written by Cheryl Camm (1998)
- Helen Fisher: Pounamu, for choir and flute or koauau / researched and written by Cheryl Camm (2000)
- Ears wide open: New Zealand music for levels 1-4 / Taringa areare (2001)
- NCEA. Level one. Finn/Rayner, Fisher, McLeod / researched and written by Cheryl Camm (2005)
- NCEA level three: Douglas Lilburn, Anthony Ritchie / researched and written by Cheryl Camm (2008)
