= Chris Watson (composer) =

New Zealand composer and film-maker

Chris Watson (born 1976) is a New Zealand composer and film–maker.

== Early life and education ==
Watson was born in Tauranga in 1976 of Ngāi te Rangi descent. Both his parents were pianists. He attended St Peter's School in Cambridge where he received his first introduction to new music and Stockhausen. Although he enrolled at Victoria University of Wellington to study piano he ended up studying composition becoming inspired by composers John Psathas, Jack Body, Ross Harris, Dylan Lardelli and Chris Gendall.

He graduated with a PhD in 2007 from Victoria with his thesis on the impact of music notation software on composing.

== Career ==
Watson's works have been performed by orchestras and ensembles in New Zealand, Western Australia and Japan. The Australian Composers' Orchestral Forum chose his work Vacillations to be recorded by the West Australian Symphony Orchestra, the first time a New Zealand work had been selected. In 2002 his work Derailleurs won the Asian Composers' League Young Composers Competition in South Korea.

Watson was the Mozart Fellow at the University of Otago from 2008 to 2009, where he composed ogee.

In 2008 Watson made a 42 minute documentary film at the Composers Association Workshop, The CANZ Nelson Composers Workshop: Inside the Incubator, which was screened for the first time on the opening night of the 2009 Workshop. Watson had become aware that there was little film of New Zealand composers' works where the music did not involve performance art, film, dance or some other visual element. Since 2010 as manager of the Resound project for SOUNZ he has continued to build a body of film work of performances of works by New Zealand composers.

== Awards ==
In 2004 Watson was the recipient of a CANZ Trust Fund Award. In 2015 he won the SOUNZ Contemporary Award at the APRA Awards New Zealand for his work sing songs self.

== Selected works ==
=== Publications ===
- Watson, Chris (2007). "Set theory: cliques in New Zealand composition". Canzona. 28 (49): 76–79.
- Watson, Chris (July 2008). "The pedagogical response to music notation software: some suggestions". Sound arts: the MENZA magazine. 4 (2): 4–5. ISSN 1177-4371.
- Watson, C. (2007). "Caught on film". Canzona. 28 (49): 80–82.

=== Compositions ===
- Adversaria (2001) – for orchestra
- Derailleurs (2001) – flute, guitar, percussion, cello and piano
- vers libre (2002) – for flute, clarinet in B flat and guitar
- Vacillations (2002) – for full orchestra
- Pivotal Orbits (2002) – for orchestra
- Don't Mess with Texas (2003) – setting of sixteen haiku for soprano and ensemble
- Nacelle (2003) – concerto for B flat clarinet and ensemble
- circuit:spiral (2005) – for orchestra
- Jangeran (2005) – for gamelan and orchestra
- Now I know (2007) – solo clarinet and Javanese gamelan
- ogee (2009) – for orchestra and solo violin
- Some Cries of Wellington (2014) – for six voices and two string quartets
- sing songs self (2015) – a single movement piano concerto
- cloud transcription (2017) – for period instruments
