= Composers Association of New Zealand =

The Composers Association of New Zealand (CANZ), established in 1974, after an initial meeting of composers was organised by David Farquhar. Farquhar was the association's first president. It is a body that lobbies for the interests of New Zealand composers.

Through its affiliations with the International Society for Contemporary Music (ISCM) and the Asian Composers League, CANZ provides its members with opportunities to participate in international music festivals as well as other opportunities. The organisation's flagship event is the annual CANZ Nelson Composers Workshop, a four-day gathering of New Zealand's emerging composers. CANZ members receive the yearbook, Canzona, and the bi-monthly newsletter, Canzonetta. Composer and scholar Glenda Keam was President of CANZ from 2007 to 2017.

The association presents two prizes annually: the KBB Citation for Services to New Zealand Music and the CANZ Trust Fund Award which recognises current compositional achievement.

== Award recipients ==
KBB Citation for Services to New Zealand Music

- 1976 Alex Lindsay (posthumous)
- 1977 Peter Godfrey
- 1979 Owen Jensen
- 1980 Thomas Vernon Griffiths
- 1981 Frederick Page
- 1982 Ashley Heenan
- 1983 Larry Pruden (posthumous)
- 1984 David Farquhar
- 1985 Jack Body
- 1986 Tony Vercoe
- 1987 Margaret Neilsen
- 1988 John Thomson
- 1989 Philip Norman
- 1990 Ross Harris
- 1991 William Dart
- 1992 John Ritchie
- 1993 William Southgate
- 1994 John Rimmer
- 1995 Nan Anderson
- 1996 John Hopkins
- 1997 Auckland Philharmonia
- 1998 Jack Speirs
- 1999 Dorothy Freed
- 2000 Dorothea Franchi
- 2001 Richard Nunns
- 2002 Waiteata Music Press
- 2003 175 East
- 2004 Scilla Askew
- 2005 John Cousins
- 2006 Karen Grylls
- 2007 Gillian Whitehead
- 2008 Jenny McLeod
- 2009 Andrew Uren
- 2010 Chris Cree Brown
- 2011 Allan Thomas
- 2012 NZTrio
- 2013 Gretchen LaRoche
- 2014 John Elmsly
- 2015 Stephen De Pledge
- 2016 Stroma
- 2017 Peter Scholes
- 2018 Mark Menzies
- 2019 Audio Foundation
- 2020 Pyramid Foundation
- 2021 Wayne Laird

Composers Association New Zealand Trust Fund award

- 1985 Philip Dadson
- 1986 Chris Cree Brown
- 1987 Dorothy Buchanan
- 1988 David Hamilton
- 1989 Eric Biddington
- 1990 Kenneth Young
- 1991 Leonie Holmes
- 1992 Not awarded
- 1993 John Young
- 1994 Neville Hall
- 1995 Maria Grenfell
- 1996 John Psathas
- 1997 Helen Bowater
- 1998 Anthony Ritchie
- 1999 Philip Brownlee
- 2000 Eve de Castro-Robinson
- 2001 Rachel Clement
- 2002 Penny Axtens
- 2003 James Gardner
- 2004 Chris Watson
- 2005 Dylan Lardelli
- 2006 Samuel Holloway
- 2007 Patrick Shepherd
- 2008 Gareth Farr
- 2009 Robin Toan
- 2010 Gao Ping
- 2011 Michael Norris
- 2012 Louise Webster
- 2013 Alex Taylor
- 2014 Chris Gendall
- 2015 Dorothy Ker
- 2016 Ross Harris
- 2017 Celeste Oram
- 2018 Lyell Cresswell
- 2019 Reuben Jelleyman
- 2020 Hermione Johnson
- 2021 Elliott Vaughan
