= Samuel Holloway =

New Zealand composer (born 1981)

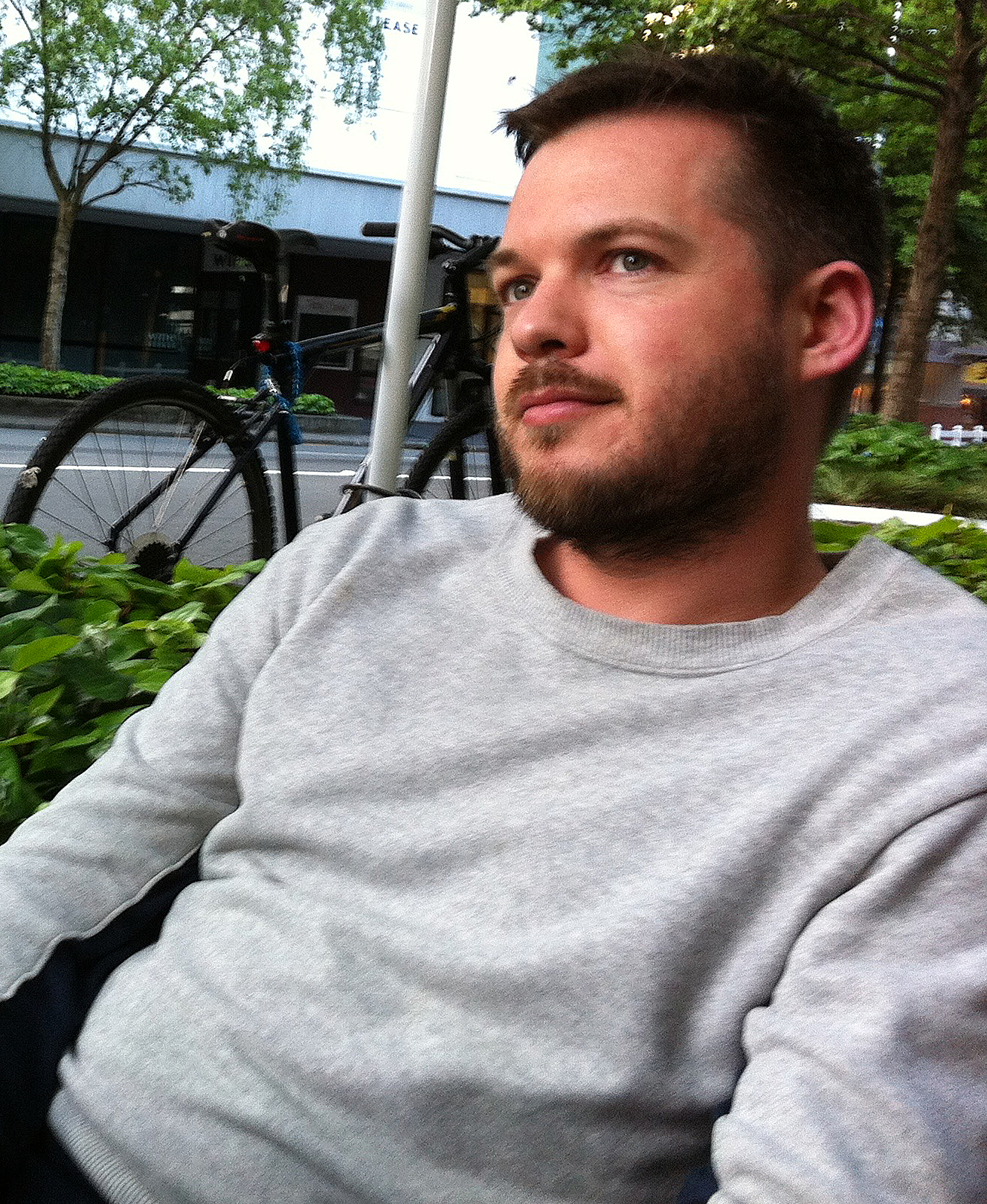
- Samuel Holloway 2012
- Born: Samuel Holloway; 1981 (age 44–45)
- Education: University of Auckland
- Known for: Contemporary music
- Notable work: Middle Ear, Domestic Architecture, Corpse and Mirror
- Style: Experimental

Samuel Holloway (born 1981) is an Auckland-based composer of contemporary music and an educator.

== Early life and education ==
From 2000 Holloway studied music and philosophy at the University of Auckland where he was taught by Eve de Castro-Robinson. He graduated in 2005 with a Masters degree in Music and Composition.

== Music career ==
Soon after graduation Holloway's work Stapes was performed by the NZTrio in the University of Auckland's Music Theatre and has since been published in printed form by the Wai-te-ata Music Press. It was the first in a series of three works under the title Middle Ear and indicates Holloway's early interest in the foundations of sound. The other two parts are Malleus and Incus. Stapes itself is named after the ear's smallest bone that transmits to the inner ear the vibrations that make up sound. Fellow composer and music commentator Hermione Johnson noted that in Stapes Holloway was able to create a 'microtonal sound from the piano by combining it with quarter tones from the violin and cello'. Music critic William Dart later credited Stapes as marking the beginning of Holloway's 'international success.' Stapes went on to be awarded First Prize in the Asian Composers League Young Composer Competition at the ISCM World New Music Days in Hong Kong in 2007. In 2005 Malleus won the Lilburn Prize at the University of Auckland and the following year Holloway was awarded the Composers Association of New Zealand Trust Fund Award. Composer and conductor Kenneth Young later described the piece as having 'an almost liquid quality which is totally compelling.' Another early composition of Holloway's to be performed was Fault which was written in 2004 and workshopped by the Auckland Philharmonia and the New Zealand Symphony Orchestra. In 2007 it was performed at the Asia-Pacific Festival receiving the Asian Composers League (ACL) Yoshirō Irino Memorial Prize. In 2008 Holloway was the third composer to be awarded the Lilburn Residency in Wellington. While there he worked on Domestic Architecture that had been commissioned by the Asian Composers League. It was premiered the following year at the Asian-Pacific Contemporary Music Festival in Tongyeong, Korea. Art critic and writer William Dart wrote of the work. 'It was a hushed gem, fashioned and performed with a jeweller's attention to detail and … an exquisite small world, the gravitational force of which was difficult to resist'.

For the next seven or so years Holloway continued to write music reviews for Radio New Zealand and other outlets. 2009 saw him take over as Music Director of 175 East, a musical ensemble created by James Gardner in 1996 and considered to be 'one of New Zealand's foremost contemporary music ensembles, presenting concerts of cutting-edge music.' Art critic William Dart described the ensemble as,'unflinchingly contemporary.'

Holloway was awarded the Mozart Fellowship at the University of Otago in 2013. The Fellowship had been established in 1969 to 'aid and encourage composers of music in the practice and advancement of their art…'. Three years later he was the 2016 Civitella Ranieri Fellow, a residency for international writers, composers, and visual artists located in a fifteenth century castle in Umbria, Italy. In 2020 Holloway became the Associate Director (Artistic) of the 2020 ISCM World New Music Days and since 2021, under his imprint Score, Holloway has published contemporary music scores and since 2022 co-edited BLOT a journal for sound, music and performance in Aotearoa.

As an academic in the field of music Holloway has held teaching and administrative positions at Unitech Te Pūkenga from 2014-2021, The University of Auckland, and is currently a Senior Manager at the Auckland University of Technology. Holloway lives in Auckland with his partner the gallerist Michael Lett.

== Work in the Visual Arts ==
In 2013 Holloway began a long-term collaboration with the Auckland artist group et al. Their installation Upright Piano, with a score by Holloway, was first shown at Michael Lett in April of that year. It was purchased by the Chartwell Collection and shown in the 2017 exhibition Shout Whisper Wail at Auckland Art Gallery Toi o Tāmaki. It has also been shown in a number of exhibitions including UNITEC's Gallery One in 2019, The Polyphonic Sea at the Bundanon Gallery in Australia in 2023 and the Whangārei Art Museum in January 2026.

Holloway was appointed to the Public Art Advisory Panel of the Auckland Council in 2014 on the basis of his arts and cultural interests.

In 2015 pianist Stephen De Pledge performed a number of works by New Zealand composers including a piece commissioned from Holloway on Michael Parekowhai's piano sculpture He Korero Purakau mo Te Awanui o Te Motu: story of a New Zealand river.

Holloway has also made explicit references to other artists in his work including the American Jasper Johns. His 2017 piano trio Corpse and Mirror links to a specific series of Jasper Johns's paintings with cross-hatched patterning reflecting Holloway's own interest in the forms. Holloway said of this work that it 'shared formal and conceptual concerns, among them: automatism, repetition, the repurposing of familiar/unremarkable materials and the slippage between surface/material and meaning.'

== Selected compositions ==
2007 Terrain vague Commissioned by Stephen de Pledge, with funding from the James Wallace Arts Trust.

2007 Strange Loops Performed by Stroma directed by Hamish McKeich.

2008 Domestic Architecture (String Quartet)

2008 Terrain Vague

2009 Impossible Songs

2010 Sillage

2011 Hauptstimme

2012 Austerity Measures

2013 Hard Science

2013 Matter, for violin, viola, cello, and piano

2013 Soft Logic, a solo work for piano and Matter

2014 Dumb Objects (https://sounz.org.nz/works/22189)

2014 Things

2017 Corpse and Mirror (Piano trio)

2018 Japonisme

2016 Mono (Recorder koto and shō)

2021 Primary Structures (Shō and tenor recorder)

2020 Untitled (Gate II)

2021 May

2021 Untitled (and and)

2021 Dualities I and II

2022 A sound that starts imperceptibly during another piece and only becomes apparent when that piece is over
