= Rattle Records =

Rattle Records, established in 1991, is a contemporary art-music label based in Auckland, New Zealand. It releases compositions generally by New Zealand composers in contemporary art genres. It has been described as "the de facto home of New Zealand music that didn't fit the three-minute pop song format"

== History ==
Rattle Records as a label and a studio was established by Steve Garden, Tim Gummer and Keith Hill in 1991 to publish music 'outside of the usual commercial musical imperatives'. They used the German label ECM Records as an inspiration. Rattle was owned by Victoria University of Wellington's publishing division for a time and when that ended Steve Garden took over again.

There have been over 150 releases and over 44 award nominations. In the Aotearoa Music Awards 2020 all three finalists in the Best Classical Artist category were Rattle recordings with 11 Frames by Andrew Beer & Sarah Watkins winning.

== Artists ==
Rattle has represented over 100 different artists since its inception including:

- Whirimako Black
- Jonathan Besser
- Jack Body
- Hayden Chisholm
- Chris Gendall
- Michael Houstoun
- Diedre Irons
- Natalia Mann
- Hirini Melbourne
- Jian Liu
- Sam Leamy
- Jenny McLeod
- NZ Guitar Quartet
- Nga Tae
- Keith Price
- Richard Nunns
- John Psathas
- Jenny Wollerman
- Sounddome
- Eve de Castro-Robinson,
- Rodger Fox
- Gillian Whitehead
- Te Koki Trio
- Ariana Tikao

== See also ==
- List of record labels
- Music of New Zealand
