= Chris Gendall =

New Zealand composer (born 1980)

Christopher Thomas Gendall (born 1980) is a New Zealand composer and lecturer in composition at the University of Auckland.

== Early life and education ==
Born in 1980 in Hamilton Gendall studied composition at Victoria University in Wellington. Gendall studied under Roberto Sierra and Steven Stucky at Cornell University and was awarded his PhD in 2010 with his thesis entitled New Musical Rhythm: Toward a Reductive Analytical Method for Music since 1900.

== Career ==
In 2009 Gendall, along with Gillian Whitehead, Ross Harris, John Psathas and Eve de Castro-Robinson, was one of the composers chosen by SOUNZ (Centre for New Zealand Music) to compose for SOUNZtender an online auction in which anyone could put up a tender for a composer's work. Gendall's composition Suite for String Orchestra was written while he was Composer in Residence at the Banff Centre in Alberta.

In 2010 he was appointed as the Creative New Zealand/Jack C Richards Composer in Residence at the New Zealand School of Music at Victoria University. The Vector Wellington Orchestra (now Orchestra Wellington) appointed Gendall as their Composer in Residence for 2011. His Triple Concerto for the orchesta and the NZTrio was performed in 2012.

Gendall was Mozart Fellow at the University of Otago in 2016 and 2017. During the residency he composed Talking Earth for brass band.

In 2020 on the 250th anniversary of Beethoven's birth he received a commission from the Auckland Philharmonia and composed Disquiet for piano trio based on Beethoven's piano trio Op. 70 no. 2.

Gendall has participated in a number of international festivals and conferences including the Wellesley Composers’ Conference, the Aspen Music Festival, the Britten-Pears Contemporary Composition programme, the Royaumont Voix Nouvelles Composition Course, and the Aldeburgh Festival and his works have been performed by orchestras and ensembles in New Zealand and elsewhere.

Gendall has also worked for RNZ as an assistant producer for the Upbeat programme. In 2018 he was president of the Composers Association of New Zealand. He has also been a mentor for the NZSO National Youth Orchestra Composer in Residence in 2017, 2018, 2020 and 2024, and for the NZSO Todd Young Composer Award in 2017.

== Awards and honours ==
Gendall won two awards in 2005 and 2006: a New Zealand Symphony Orchestra Todd Young Composer Award and an ASCAP Foundation Morton Gould Young Composer Award.

In 2008 he won the SOUNZ Contemporary Award at the APRA Awards for Wax Lyrical.

== Selected works ==
- Visionnaire (2003) – for vocal soloists, SATB choir and piano
- Bop (2003) – for solo trombone and chamber ensemble
- Hand to hand (2005) – for percussion ensemble of six players
- Agitato (2007) – for chamber orchestra
- Gung-ho (2007)
- Wax lyrical (2008) – for chamber ensemble
- Suite for string orchestra (2009)
- Gravitas (2011) – for orchestra
- Three details (2012) – for guitar, pre-recorded electronics and 4-8 sustaining instruments
- Triple concerto (2012) – for violin, cello, piano and orchestra
- Incident: an opera in one act (2014)
- The charm offensive (2014) – for soprano and orchestra
- Choruses: for shō, recorder and koto (2015)
- Violin concerto (2016)
- Talking earth (2017)
- Siteswap (2019) – for solo horn
- Disquiet (2020) – for piano trio
- Crazing (2021) – for violin and percussion
