= Martin Lodge (composer) =

New Zealand composer (1954–2024)

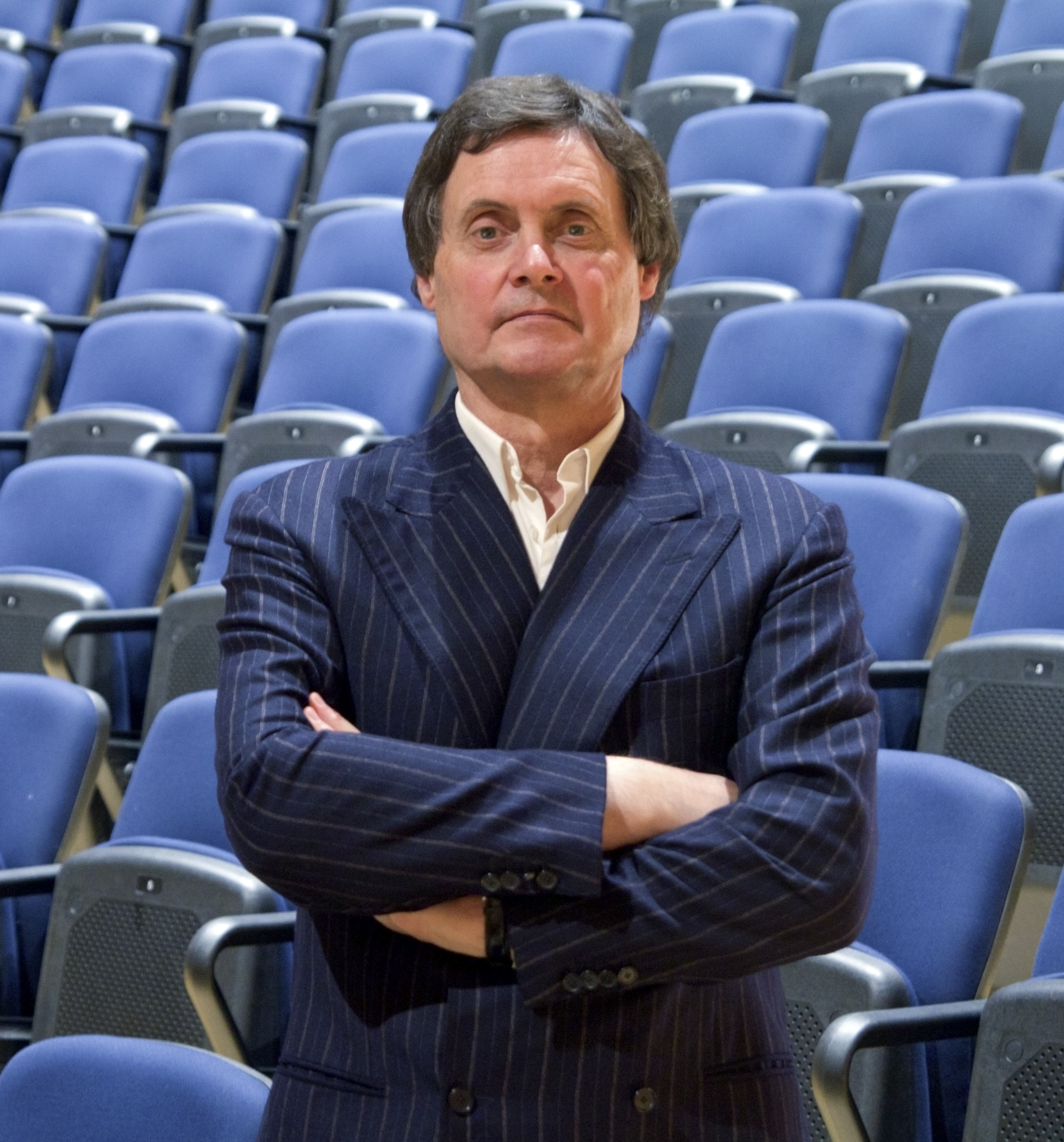
- Lodge in 2015
- Born: 3 December 1954; Tauranga, New Zealand
- Died: 18 December 2024 (aged 70); Hamilton, New Zealand
- Education: University of Waikato, Victoria University of Wellington, Sydney Conservatorium of Music
- Occupations: Composer; professor of music

Martin Victor Lodge (3 December 1954 – 18 December 2024) was a New Zealand composer and Emeritus Professor of Music at the University of Waikato.

== Life and career ==
Lodge was born in Tauranga on 3 December 1954. He studied English and German at the University of Waikato graduating with an MA in English literature. He went on to do an MMus in composition at Victoria University of Wellington under Douglas Lilburn and David Farquhar followed by a PhD in composition from the Sydney Conservatorium of Music.

After spending 13 years as a freelance composer, while doing a variety of other jobs, he was the Mozart Fellow at the University of Otago in 1990 and 1991. In 1993 he was the Composer in Residence at the Auckland Philharmonia. He took up a position at the Conservatorium of Music at the University of Waikato in 1995 where he founded the music department and was instrumental in creating a performing arts venue, the Dr John Gallagher Concert Chamber. He was responsible for archiving the works of music historian and writer John Mansfield Thomson at the university.

He initiated the study of Māori music for the Bachelor of Music degree and commissioned a set of traditional Māori instruments, taonga pūoro, for the university. He composed several works using taonga pūoro: Toru (2003) which was dedicated to Hirini Melbourne, Hau (2005) and Oiche ghealai (moonlit night) (2009).

Lodge was diagnosed with a brain tumour in 2022, and died in Hamilton on 18 December 2024, at the age of 70.

== Selected works ==
=== Publications ===
- Lodge, M. (2003). John Mansfield Thomson: Selected Writings. Steele Roberts Ltd.
- Lodge, M., & Ulenberg, P. (2007). History in the making: The John Mansfield Thomson Archive at the University of Waikato. Canzona, 28(49), 96–97.

=== Compositions ===
- Mozart Brief-Ly I and II (1991) – for two clarinets, two bassett horns and SATB soloists, commissioned by the New Zealand Symphony Orchestra
- WAM! - Reminiscences of Wolfgang Amadeus Mozart (1991) – orchestral fantasy on Mozart themes, commissioned by the Dunedin Symphony Orchestra
- Symphony No. 1 (Flowers of the Sea) (1994)
- Hinterland (1997) – for orchestra
- Epitaph for Douglas Lilburn (2001) – for solo cello
- Toru (2003) – for taonga pūoro, cello and clarinet
- Hau (2005) – for cello and taonga pūoro
- Farewell for David Farquhar (2007) – for two cellos
- Pastorale (2008) – for string quartet
- Oiche ghealai (moonlit night) (2009) – for taonga pūoro and flute
- Voces naturae - I: Locus iste (2010) – for mixed ensemble, live video and live sonic electronics
- Aria with Commentary (2011) – for two cellos
