= R. A. K. Mason =

New Zealand poet

- Born: Ronald Allison Kells Mason; 10 January 1905; Penrose, Auckland, New Zealand
- Died: 13 July 1971 (aged 66); Takapuna, New Zealand
- Occupation: Poet

Ronald Allison Kells Mason (10 January 1905 – 13 July 1971) was a New Zealand poet. Described by Allen Curnow as New Zealand's "first wholly original, unmistakably gifted poet", he was born in Penrose, Auckland on 10 January 1905. He was educated at Auckland Grammar School, where he met fellow poet A. R. D. Fairburn. Mason was the holder of the Robert Burns Fellowship at the University of Otago in 1962. He died in Takapuna, Auckland on 13 July 1971. He is buried at Purewa Cemetery.

== Works ==
=== Poetry ===
- The Beggar (Whitcombe & Tombs, 1924)
- Penny Broadsheet (Whitcombe & Tombs, 1924)
- No New Thing (Spearhead Publishers, 1934)
- End of Day (Caxton Press, 1936)
- This Dark Will Lighten (Caxton Press, 1941)
- China Dances and Other Poems (John McIndoe, 1962)
- Collected Poems (Pegasus Press, 1962)

=== Radio Play ===
- Squire Speaks (Caxton Press, 1938)

=== Prose ===
- Frontier Forsaken: An Outline History of the Cook Islands (Challenge, 1947)
- Four Short Stories 1931–1935 (Holloway Press, 2003)

=== Music ===
- The Young Man Thinks of Sons by NZ group Ferocious (Bill Direen, Johannes Contag and Mark S. Williams) (Rattle Records, February 2020. Music video (2020).
- New Zealand composer David Farquhar (1928-2007) composed a setting of "On the Swag" for unaccompanied choir. The score can be obtained from SOUNZ.
- On the Swag Christopher Marshall (1956-) for mixed choir, unaccompanied. For details see SOUNZ and the National Library of New Zealand.
- On the Swag by Dunedin hymn writer Colin Gibson, sung by tenor soloist Edmund Hintz, on “Spirited People” by the Festival Singers of Wellington.
