= Dylan Lardelli =

NZ composer & guitarist (born 1979)

- Born: 1979 (age 46–47)
- Genre: Classical
- Occupation: Composer
- Instrument: Guitar

Dylan Lardelli (born 1979) is a New Zealand composer and guitarist. He is of Māori Ngāti Porou and Ngāi Tūhoe descent.

== Early life ==
Lardelli was born in Wellington in 1979 of Ngāti Porou and Ngāi Tūhoe descent. He attended school in Hawkes Bay, starting to learn the guitar in the 5th form (Year 11 in the New Zealand school system).

He enrolled at Victoria University of Wellington to study guitar and composition, where his lecturers were John Psathas, Ross Harris and Jack Body. He graduated with a Bachelor's degree in guitar and, in 2003, a Masters in composition.

== Career ==
Lardelli won first prize in the 2003 Asian Composers League Young Composers Competition for his work Four fragments. In 2003–2004 he was composer in residence with the Auckland Philharmonia Orchestra, a position he shared with Anthony Young. He received the Composers Association of New Zealand Trust Fund award in 2005.

Lardelli has studied in Europe and his works have been performed internationally. He received a Creative New Zealand Edwin Carr Scholarship in 2006 which he used to study with Stefano Bellon in Venice. He worked with de:Dieter Mack at the Lübeck Musikhochschule in Germany from 2009 to 2010. His music has been performed at the Gaudeamus music week in Amsterdam, the Darmstadt New Music Festival and in Europe, Asia, North American and Australia.

In 2017 he received funding from the APRA AMCOS Arts Music Fund to compose a work for the German ensemble Musikfabrik to tour Germany, New Zealand and Japan.

Lardelli was the University of Otago's Mozart Fellow for two years in 2018 and 2019. In 2026 his string trio Light Lines won the SOUNZ Contemporary Award - Te Tohu Auaha at the APRA Silver Scroll Awards.

== Selected works ==
- Four fragments: chamber ensemble (2002)
- Three colours: for orchestra (2002)
- To my winter: for solo oboe (2002)
- From grey : introduction and movement for string orchestra and harp (2002)
- First ice (Lachrymae) : prelude and movement for solo guitar (2002)
- Eidolon : solo cello (2003)
- Reign : a “landscape prelude” for piano (2005)
- Duo for oboe and guitar (2005)
- Revenir. II : for saxophone quartet (2005)
- Tumbu : for solo clarinet and orchestra (2005)
- Frederick Street fragment : for children's chamber orchestra (2007)
- Pan awakes : for orchestral wind & brass (2009)
- Arrangements : for saxophone quartet (2011)
- Duo for oboe and guitar (2011)
- Mobiles : for flute, violin, clarinet, cello and piano (2011)
- Hiki-iro : for solo koto (2012)
- Refining metals : for piccolo/bass flute, soprano saxophone and percussion (2012)
- One body : for clarinet quartet (2013)
- Between strings : for violin, cello, guzheng, piano (2013)
- Mapping, an inlay : for string quartet (2015)
- Conditions of forgetting : for tenor recorder, electric guitar, percussion, violin, cello and double bass (2016)
- Walking : for Electone (2018)
- Carrying : for flute, and bass recorder (2018)
- Holding : for shō, oboe, recorder, violin and koto (2018)
