= Kenneth Young (New Zealand composer) =

New Zealand composer, conductor, tuba player

- Born: Kenneth William Young; 11 November 1955 (age 71); Invercargill, New Zealand
- Genre: Classical
- Occupations: Composer, conductor, lecturer
- Years active: 1976–present
- Labels: Naxos, Atoll, ABC Classics
- Formerly of: New Zealand Symphony Orchestra, Auckland Philharmonia Orchestra, Tasmanian Symphony Orchestra
- Website: koruartists.com/kenneth-young.html

Kenneth Young (born 11 November 1955, Invercargill, New Zealand) is a composer, conductor, radio presenter and lecturer in composition, conducting and orchestration at the New Zealand School of Music, Massey University and Victoria University of Wellington. As a composer, Young has had works commissioned by New Zealand and Australian orchestras and arts organisations including the New Zealand Symphony Orchestra, Auckland Philharmonia Orchestra, Tasmanian Symphony Orchestra New Zealand International Arts Festival and Chamber Music New Zealand. He works as a freelance composer and is fully represented by SOUNZ: The Centre for New Zealand Music. In 1976, Young became the principal tuba for the New Zealand Symphony Orchestra and first conducted the orchestra in 1985 becoming Conductor in Residence in 1993. In 2001, he resigned from the orchestra to become a full-time conductor, composer and recording artist for orchestras in New Zealand and Australia, as well as engagements in Japan and the United Kingdom. He is well known for his interpretation of Romantic, 20th Century, New Zealand and Australian orchestral repertoire and in 2012 conducted both the winning album, Angel at Ahipara and finalist album, Releasing the Angel, for Best Classical Album at the New Zealand Music Awards. Young has been recorded by EMI, Atoll Records, Continuum, Trust Records, ABC Classics and Naxos and is a frequent presenter on RESOUND, Radio New Zealand Concert introducing and contextualising work from the RNZ archives. In 2004 was awarded the Lilburn Trust Citation in Recognition of Outstanding Services to New Zealand Music.

== Biography ==
Young was born in Invercargill in 1955 and completed his schooling in Christchurch at Cashmere High School. He was involved in brass band music, but his music teacher, Frank Dennis, encouraged him to compose, conduct and study music seriously, beyond the brass band movement. Young studied composition at the University of Canterbury and the University of Auckland. During this time he played percussion and tuba for the Christchurch Symphony Orchestra and the New Zealand National Youth Orchestra.

In 1976 Young was appointed Principal Tuba of the New Zealand Symphony Orchestra and conducted the orchestra for the first time in 1985. In 1988, he became a member of the faculty of the New Zealand School of Music, today a joint department of the Victoria University of Wellington and Massey University where he lectures in conducting and orchestration. In 1991 Young was appointed as the Composer in Residence at the New Zealand Symphony Orchestra and in 2001 he resigned from post of Principal Tuba to work full-time as a conductor and composer. In 2004 Young was awarded the Lilburn Trust Citation in Recognition of Outstanding Services to New Zealand Music.

== Activities ==
=== Composing ===
Kenneth Young is officially recognised as one of New Zealand's leading composers and has won awards from the Composer's Association of New Zealand, SOUNZ Contemporary Awards, Radio NZ Concert and Trans-Tasman conductor exchange. He is regularly commissioned by ensembles in New Zealand and Australia including the NZSO, Chamber Music New Zealand, the Tasmanian Symphony Orchestra, BBANZ, the International Festival of the Arts, Auckland Philharmonia Orchestra, Orchestra Wellington and Radio New Zealand. His compositions have been performed and broadcast in New Zealand, the United States, Europe and Australia. Recent premiers include his ‘Portrait’ for Solo Violin and Orchestra with the NZSO and his Lux Aeterna with the Tasmanian Symphony Orchestra, both to wide critical acclaim. Young has forty-eight commissioned works registered and represented through the Centre for New Zealand Music and twenty-two recordings.

=== Conducting ===
Kenneth Young works regularly as a conductor throughout New Zealand and Australia. In New Zealand he works with the New Zealand Symphony Orchestra, New Zealand Chamber Orchestra and all regional orchestras including the Auckland Philharmonia Orchestra, Christchurch Symphony Orchestra and Orchestra Wellington. In his capacity as conductor, he has recorded with EMI, Atoll Records, Continuum, Trust Records, ABC Classics and Naxos with Best Classical Album releases in 2002 and 2012. He is widely regarded for his interpretation and recordings of New Zealand composers. These include Douglas Lilburn, Edwin Carr, David Farquhar, Lyell Cresswell, Anthony Ritchie, Gareth Farr, Christopher Blake, Jack Body and many others. He also regularly conducts seasons with the Royal New Zealand Ballet Co. and the Australian Ballet.

In Australia Young conducts the Melbourne Symphony Orchestra, Queensland Symphony Orchestra, the West Australian Symphony Orchestra, Adelaide Symphony Orchestra, Tasmanian Symphony Orchestra and Orchestra Victoria. Engagement further afield include the City of Osaka Sinfonia, and the BBC Scottish Symphony Orchestra.

=== Teaching ===
Young was a faculty member at the New Zealand School of Music — Te Kōkī, Victoria University of Wellington, from 1988 until his retirement in 2019. He lectured in conducting, orchestration and composition. In 2011, he was also appointed at the Auckland Philharmonia Orchestra's composer mentor, for their "Composer in Residence" programme.

== Discography ==
=== Composer Discography ===
The following are selected recordings featuring Kenneth Young as composer.

- Waiteata Collection of New Zealand Music Vol. 13 – NZ Piano Music for 4 Hands Wai-te-ata Music Press WTA013 (2012)
- GUNG-HO – Virtuoso Works for Trombone David Bremner: Atoll Records ACD109, (2009), Winner of Best Classical Album, New Zealand Music Awards, 2009
- Matthew Marshall – Still Life with Guitar: Mr M Productions 2009
- New Zealand Chamber Brass – New Zealand Works for Brass Quintet Members of the Auckland Philharmonia Orchestra and New Zealand Symphony Orchestra
- Song of the Black Swan – music for violin and harp Atoll Records, ACD199, Dawn Harms and Carolyn Mills (1999)
- Waiteata Collection of New Zealand Music Vol. 13 – NZ Piano Music for 4 Hands Wai-te-ata Music Press WTA013 (2012)
- Woolston Brass: Millennium:CDWB 3896340/01 Woolston Brass (1998)

=== Conductor Discography ===
The following are selected recordings featuring Kenneth Young as conductor.

- Christopher Blake: Angel at Ahipara: Atoll Records ACD441, New Zealand Symphony Orchestra Strings (2012), Winner, Best Classical Album, New Zealand Music Awards, 2012
- Eve de Castro-Robinson: Releasing the Angel: Atoll Records ACD141, New Zealand Symphony Orchestra,(2011), Finalist, Best Classical Album, New Zealand Music Awards 2012
- Gareth Farr: From the Depths Sound the Great Sea Gongs: Trust Records MMT2021D (2009)
- Gareth Farr: Ruaumoko: Trust Records MMT2042, New Zealand Symphony Orchestra
- Gary Daverne: Orchestral Music: Viscount Recordings VRCD 0841
- Gary Daverne: Youth of Auckland: EMI 557 9052
- Island Song: Trust Records MMT2044, New Zealand Symphony Orchestra (2010)
- Jack Body: Pulse Winner of the 2002 Best Classical Album, New Zealand Music Awards
- Landscapes: New Zealand Orchestral Music: Trust Records MMT2037, New Zealand Symphony Orchestra
- New Zealand Composers: Continuum CCD 1073-2 | New Zealand Symphony Orchestra (1995)
- Parihaka: Trust Records MMT2033, New Zealand Symphony Orchestra (2000)
- Passing – Asia Pacific Festival 2007: Atoll Records and Move Records MD 3327, New Zealand Symphony Orchestra(2009)
- Philip Norman: Peter Pan: Royal New Zealand Ballet | Orchestra Wellington (1999)
- Waiteata Collection of New Zealand Music Vol. 4 – Composer Portrait: Ross Harris: Wai-te-ata Music Press CD WTA004 (1987)
- Waiteata Collection of New Zealand Music Vol. 6 – Composer Portrait: Jack Body: Wai-te-ata Music Press CDWTA006 (2003)
- Classic Collection: NZSO in association with SKC

== Selected works ==
A complete list of works can be found at SouNZ Centre for New Zealand Music

- Dance for orchestra
- Five Pieces for Solo Piano
- Four Questions, No Answers for mixed chamber septet
- Lux Aeterna for full orchestra
- Piano Concerto for piano and orchestra
- Portrait for solo violin and small orchestra
- Remembering for violin and orchestra
- Symphony No. 2 for orchestra
- Virgen de la esperanza for orchestra

== Awards ==
- CANZ Trust Fund Award (1990)
- SOUNZ Contemporary Award Finalist (2005) for Symphony No 2
- Trans-Tasman Composer Exchange (2007) (composer)
- New Zealand Music Awards: Best Classical Album (2012) Winner: Angel at Ahipara (conductor)
- New Zealand Music Awards: Best Classical Album (2012) Finalist: "Releasing the Angel" (conductor)
- SOUNZ Contemporary Award Finalist (2012) for Four Questions, No Answers for chamber ensemble and soprano (composer)
- NZSO-SOUNZ-RNZC Recordings Award (2012) (composer)
- Mozart Fellowship, University of Otago (2020–21)
- Lilburn Trust Citation in Recognition of Outstanding Services to New Zealand Music
