= Penny Axtens =

New Zealand composer

Penelope Axtens (born 1974) is a New Zealand composer.

== Biography ==
Axtens studied composition at the University of Auckland where she gained an Honours degree before completing a Masters at Victoria University of Wellington in 1999. She studied under Ross Harris and John Psathas. In 1994 she won a Douglas Lilburn Student Composition Award. She received the Composers Association of New Zealand Trust Fund Award in 2002.

The New Zealand Symphony Orchestra performed her work Part the Second which won the orchestra's inaugural Music 2000 Prize. A further work from the sixth hour was also performed by the orchestra. She has written works for solo instruments and small ensembles which have been performed by contemporary music groups including 175 East.

Axtens left New Zealand in the mid-2000s and lived in London and Berlin where she worked for Decca and Sony Classical. She has resumed composing taking up the Lilburn Composer-in-Residence in Wellington in 2025.
