= Andrew Perkins =

New Zealand composer, choral conductor and teacher

Andrew Perkins (born 31 December 1961) is a New Zealand composer, choral conductor and teacher. He has had a number of works recorded and performed internationally.

== Early life and education ==
Andrew Perkins was born in Warkworth in 1961. In 1985 he graduated from Auckland University with a master's degree in Music. He graduated from Melbourne University with a Ph.D. degree in music composition in 2013.

== Collected works and positions held ==
In 1986 he was elected the New Zealand delegate at the International Association of the Arts Eleventh General Assembly in Baghdad, Iraq. The congress was entitled 'Artists For Peace'. His "Requiem For Peace" for mezzo-soprano, choir, woodwind, brass and percussion was premiered during International Youth Year, performed at St. Mary's Cathedral, Parnell, Auckland (1985) by mezzo Anthea Moller, the University Singers choir, and members of the Auckland Philharmonia conducted by Juan Matteucci.

Perkins was appointed Composer in Residence of the Auckland Philharmonia in 1992. During his tenure, he produced Symphony Der Bote (performed by Carmel Carroll under the baton of William Boughton) and the song cycle Ways of Light and Life, among others. His sequence of cello orchestral movements entitled "The Flying Gardens" is frequently performed internationally by cellist Tom Pierard. One of the Flying Gardens, retitled Islamic Lament, played by Pierard, was recorded by Bach Musica New Zealand in 2010. Perkins's "Fantasia For Eight Celli" was performed by the Ensemble Philharmonia of the Auckland Philharmonia Orchestra at Auckland's Aotea Centre on 20 and 21 October 1993.

He worked as Director of Music at both the Senior College in Auckland (1995–2004), New Zealand, and at Baradene College in Remuera, Auckland (2004–2008). Baradene commissioned Andrew to compose a setting of the "Jubilate Deo" for SSATB choir, full symphony orchestra and pipe organ as part of the Baradene College Centennial Concert in 2009.

For many years he was the musical director of the Auckland Catholic Schola, stationed at St John's Church in Parnell, Auckland. The Schola specialise in Medieval and Renaissance plainchant and liturgical music in the context of the Mass.

During 2008–2016 Perkins lived in Melbourne, Australia working at the Conservatorium of Music, Melbourne University as tutor and lecturer, during which time he completed his PhD in Composition in 2013. His doctoral studies involved investigating the impact of nodal points in musicological and compositional history on his own work as a practising composer. His "Tango-Romanza", scored for full concert band, was performed by Watsonia Military Band in 2010.

== Recent works ==
Waltz-Fantasia (2010), written as part of his PhD composition portfolio, was performed and recorded during 2012 by the New Zealand Symphony Orchestra, conducted by Kenneth Young.

In July 2012 his major work "Christchurch Vespers" was performed by Pita Paczian and Bach Musica New Zealand at Holy Trinity Cathedral in Parnell, Auckland. Its musical language – a fusion of the ancient (Greek, Byzantine, Middle Eastern, Hebrew, Indian), the liturgical (Perkins sets seven texts from the Vespers for Pentecost liturgy) and the idiosyncratic (a duel between the harp and the vibraphone in The Announcement of the Eternal Gospel) is both academic and passionate.

Perkins' setting of French-Canadian artist Louise Jalbert's The Radish and the Shoe for narrator and orchestra was recorded during 2014 by the New Zealand Symphony Orchestra conducted by Hamish McKeich in English (narrated by Andrew Perkins) and in French (narrated by Luc Arnault).

Concerto Grosso for Flute, Harpsichord and Strings was premiered and recorded by flautist Adrianna Lis, harpsichordist Rosemary Barnes, with the Auckland Chamber Orchestra conducted by Peter Scholes in 2016.

Three Spanish Songs (2018) for mezzo and chamber orchestra was performed and recorded by mezzo-soprano Sally-Anne Russell with the New Zealand Symphony Orchestra conducted by Marc Taddei.

Perkins collaborated with librettist Rachel Le Rossignol, to produce a musical Singspiel entitled The Birds, based on Aristophanes' play.

== Selected works ==
- Arioso for solo pianoforte (or other keyboard instrument)
- Ave Maria, gratia plena for SATB unaccompanied choir
- Ave Maris Stella for string orchestra
- Ave Maris Stella for pipe organ
- Ave Verum Corpus – Fantasia for pipe organ
- Lux et Origo for Brass Quintet
- Butterfly for voice and piano
- Chants Montage for organ
- Christchurch Vespers for solo soprano, SATB choir and orchestra
- Cogitationes Fantasia for school orchestra and unison choir, based on the plainchant 'Cogitationes'
- Composition In Red for mezzo-soprano, flute, viola and cello
- Concertino for Flute and String Orchestra For solo flute and string orchestra
- Coventry Carol Fantasia for pipe organ
- Date in Ao Bao for school orchestra
- Dies Sanctificatus for SATB Choir with brass quartet
- Duo Concertante for cello and piano
- Fantasia for eight violoncelli for eight cellos
- Huia for harp and wind quartet
- I Prayed, and Understanding was Given Me for a cappella SATB choir and solo soprano
- It is the Lord who Gives Sight to the Blind for a cappella SATB choir
- Jubilate Deo for SATB choir and symphony orchestra
- Loquebantur for SATB unaccompanied choir
- Lord, Teach us to Number our Days for a cappella SATB choir
- Lord, You brought a Vine out of Egypt for a cappella SATB choir
- Love is Come Again for unison choir and orchestra with pipe organ
- Marian Triptych for full orchestra
- O Crux Splendidor for a cappella SATB choir
- O Little One Sweet for organ
- Psalm 73 for SATB choir
- Sinfonietta di Dieci for string orchestra
- Song to the Lord Jesus for SATB choir and organ
- String Quartet Vox Stellarum
- Symphony – Der Bote for mezzo-soprano and orchestra
- Tango-Romanza – for concert band
- The Flying Gardens for solo cello
- The Radish and the Shoe for narrator and orchestra
- Three Bohemian Sketches Three pieces for string quartet, each based on a Bohemian Folksong
- Veni Sancte Spiritus – Fantasia for pipe organ
- Waltz-Fantasia for symphony orchestra
- Ways of Light and Life a song cycle for baritone and instrumental ensemble
