= Helen Bowater =

New Zealand composer

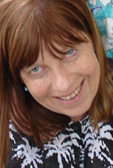
Born 1952

Helen Bowater (b. 16 Nov 1952) is a New Zealand composer. She was born in Wellington into a musical family, and studied piano and violin with Gwyneth Brown. In 1982 she graduated with a Bachelor of Music degree in music history and ethnomusicology from Victoria University of Wellington. She continued her studies in electroacoustic music with Ross Harris and in composition with Jack Body.

Bowater played in the Gamelan Padhang Moncar at Victoria University and her composition Tembang Matjapat (1999) is scored for gamelan and western strings and percussion instruments.

After completing her studies, Bowater worked as a singer, pianist and violinist with ensembles and choirs, and also worked in rock bands Extra Virgin Orchestra and pHonk and with the Victoria University Gamelan Padhang Moncar. She completed residencies at the Nelson School of Music in 1992 and at Otago University in 1993, and was composer-in-residence with the Auckland Philharmonia in 1994 and at the New Zealand School of Music, Victoria University, in 2008-09.

Bowater has published professional articles in journals including Music in New Zealand. Her music has been performed internationally.

== Honors and awards ==
- Auckland Philharmonia Graduate Composer Workshops 1992
- Mozart Fellowship at Otago University 1993
- Auckland Philharmonia Composer in Residence 1994
- CANZ Trust Fund Award 1997
- SOUNZ Contemporary Award 1999
- SOUNZ Community Commission 2001
- NZSO-SOUNZ Readings 2003
- NZSO-SOUNZ Readings 2006
- Creative New Zealand/Jack C Richards Composer Residency, New Zealand School of Music 2008

== Works ==
Selected works include:

- Banshee for two violins, cello and piano
- He does not come, setting of 5 poems for soprano and ensemble
- Ixion's Wheel for B flat clarinet and piano
- Lautari for solo violin
- New Year Fanfare for orchestra
- River of Ocean for full orchestra
- Urwachst for orchestra
- Wire Dogs for solo piano
- Nekhbet for solo piano
- Monkey for Chinese sheng, Gamelan Padhang Moncar, singer, and string quartet
