= Wai-te-ata Music Press =

Wai-te-ata Music Press is a centre of Te Kōkī New Zealand School of Music, that publishes New Zealand sheet music, CDs and other music-related publications.

Based at Victoria University of Wellington, the press was established by Douglas Lilburn in 1967 as a non-profit ‘composer facility’, which was intended to produce inexpensive editions of New Zealand music for performance and study. It was established in order to address the problem that 'increased opportunities for broadcast, performance and commercial recording of New Zealand compositions had not been equalled by an increase in opportunities for publication.'

The first score, published in 1967, was For Seven by Jenny McLeod, and was followed shortly by works by Larry Pruden, David Farquhar, John Ritchie, Ronald Tremain and Lilburn himself. The original covers were printed using an 1813 Stanhope printing press owned by Wai-te-ata Press, which had been established in 1962 by Professor Don McKenzie of the English Department. From 1981, when composer Jack Body took up the editorship, Wai-te-ata Music Press has become the largest sole publisher of New Zealand music, with over 250 scores in its catalogue.

In 2013, New Zealand School of Music lecturer Michael Norris took over the editorship of Wai-te-ata Press following Jack Body's retirement. He began his editorship with the publication of the complete Tone Clock Pieces by Jenny McLeod, as well as establishing an online store for the press's catalogue.
