= Anthony Ritchie =

New Zealand composer (born 1960)

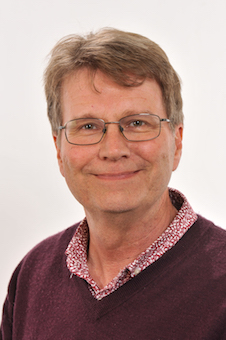
- Anthony Ritchie 2017
- Born: 1960 (age 65–66); Christchurch
- Occupations: Composer, university professor
- Website: http://www.anthonyritchie.co.nz/index.html

Anthony Damian Ritchie (born 18 September 1960) is a New Zealand composer and academic. He has been a freelance composer accepting commissions for works and in 2018 he became professor of composition at The University of Otago after 18 years of teaching composition. In 2020 he became head of the university's School of Performing Arts, a three-year position. He retired in 2026 becoming Emeritus Professor. His works number over two hundred, and include symphonies, operas, concertos, choral works, chamber music and solo works.

== Early life ==
Ritchie was born in Christchurch in 1960. He is the son of John Ritchie, who was a professor teaching composition and orchestration at the University of Canterbury. His mother was a soprano soloist and he began learning the piano at the age of nine, showing early aptitude for improvisation.

== Education ==
Ritchie began composing when still at school, attending St Bede's College in Christchurch. In 1979 he was a member of the New Zealand Youth Choir in its first year. He completed his BMus with honours in 1981 at the University of Canterbury. He studied the influence of folk music on some of Béla Bartók's works in Hungary in 1983, as well as composition with Attila Bozay and Zsolt Serei. He completed his Ph.D. on the music of Béla Bartók in 1987.

== Career ==
In 1987 Ritchie was Composer-in-Schools in Christchurch and in 1988–1989 Mozart Fellow at the University of Otago. He then became a freelance composer accepting a number of commissions. These included Theme and Variations - the search which premiered in June 1998 in Dunedin, From the Southern Marches commissioned by George Griffiths of Otago Heritage Books and premiered in March 1998, Revelation commissioned by the New Zealand Symphony Orchestra and performed in Christchurch and Wellington in 1998, a guitar concerto commissioned by the Auckland Philharmonia and played by guitarist Matthew Marshall, and dances Shoal Dance and Leaf. He has written for many other performers including Michael Houstoun and Wilma Smith.

Over the years Ritchie has collaborated with a number of writers such as Stuart Hoar, Keri Hulme and librettist Jeremy Commons. Star Fire (1995), written with Hoar, was Ritchie's first opera. It was futuristic with a sci-fi theme for primary and intermediate age school children, commissioned by Class Act Opera in Auckland who performed opera in schools. It also had environmental and Māori themes. A further collaboration with Hoar produced Quartet (2004), a comic operetta examining the lives of classical musicians on tour in New Zealand. The production included a string quartet on stage. He worked with novelist Keri Hulme on an opera Ahua (2000), the story of the Ngāi Tahu ancestor Moki. It was commissioned by the Christchurch City Choir. In 2004 he collaborated with Jeremy Commons on The God Boy an opera based on the novel by Ian Cross. It was performed by Opera Otago for the Otago Festival of the Arts. Ritchie set works by Dunedin poet Elena Poletti to create Lullabies (2015) which were originally commissioned and performed by the Auckland Choral society.

Ritchie, while not a gamelan player, was attracted to the sounds of gamelan and used gamelan scales in his symphony Boum (1993) and in his piano piece 24 Preludes (2002). 24 Preludes display many different musical influences: neo-Romantic composers, a range of time signatures, contrapuntal and harmonic styles, harpsichord and organ techniques, gamelan and celesta. Ritchie was also trying out the use of the mathematical concept of the magic square also used by composers Peter Maxwell Davies and Gillian Whitehead. The preludes were written when Ritchie took some time off from his freelance work to explore different approaches to composition.

Ritchie's oratorio Gallipoli to the Somme which commemorated the one hundred year anniversary of the Battle of the Somme was based on the book of the same name by Alexander Aitken, who was a soldier in the Otago battalion and later professor of mathematics at Edinburgh University. The oratorio had its premiere in Dunedin in 2016. Its European premiere, with Anna Leese as a soloist, was at the Sheldonian Theatre, Oxford in June 2018. It was voted New Zealand's most popular piece of classical music in RNZ Concert's Settling the Score poll in 2020.

In 2018, after 18 years of teaching composition, Ritchie became professor of composition in the Department of Music, Theatre and Performing Arts at the University of Otago. In 2020 he became head of the School of Performing Arts, a three-year position. Ritchie was made an Emeritus Professor on his retirement in April 2026.

Ritchie's composition Melencolia was nominated for a 2026 Aotearoa Music Award in the Best Classical Artist of the Year category.

== Award and honours ==
Ritchie received a Trust Fund award from the Composers Association of New Zealand in 1998 in recognition of his achievements in composition.

== Selected works ==
- Sonata for Solo Viola (1969)
- Concertino for Piano and Strings, op. 8 (1982)
- Piano Concerto, op. 9 (1982)
- String Quartet No. 1 (1983)
- Flute Concerto, op. 56 (1993)
- Symphony No. 1, Boum, op. 59 (1993)
- Viola Concerto, op. 64 (1994–95)
- Star Fire, opera, op. 68 (1995)
- Cartoon: Fantasy for Soprano Saxophone and Orchestra, op. 70 (1996; revised in 2002 for release as "Oboe Sonata", op. 70b)
- Guitar Concerto, op. 79 (1997)
- From the Southern Marches, op. 81 (1998)
- Double Concerto for Bass Clarinet and Cello, op. 93 (1999)
- Symphony No. 2, The Widening Gyre, op. 95 (1999)
- Ahua, opera, op. 96 (2000)
- 24 Preludes, for piano, op. 101 (2002)
- String Quartet No. 2 (2003)
- Quartet, opera, op. 108 (2004)
- The God Boy, opera, op. 111 (2004)
- "Clouds" for trombone with brass band or wind band, op. 114 (2005)
- Symphony No. 3, Janus, op. 150 (2010)
- Violin Concerto, op. 165 (2012)
- Symphony No. 4, Stations, op. 171 (2013)
- Gallipoli to the Somme, op. 191 (2016)
- Viola Concerto no. 2 (2018)
- Symphony No. 5, Childhood, op. 200 (2020)
- Symphony 6, op. 212 (2021)
- String Quartet No. 3 (2023)
