= Juliet Palmer =

- Born: Juliet Kiri Palmer; 28 August 1967 (age 58); Auckland, New Zealand
- Genres: Contemporary, chamber, orchestral, opera
- Occupation: Composer

Juliet Palmer is a contemporary composer living in Toronto, Ontario, Canada.

== Career ==
Juliet Kiri Palmer was born in New Zealand in 1967, where she completed a Masters of Music in performance, composition, and time-based art at the University of Auckland. She moved to New York City in 1990 to work with interdisciplinary pioneer Meredith Monk and obtained her PhD at Princeton University in 1999. Now living in Toronto, Ontario, Canada, she is an active composer and interdisciplinary artist.

Her compositions cover a wide range from chamber music and dance theatre to orchestral and opera. Palmer's music has been featured in festivals in US, UK, New Zealand, Netherlands, Japan, Italy, France, Austria and Canada. Her work has been broadcast widely, including radio networks in New Zealand, Australia, the UK, US, Canada and Japan.

A detailed catalogue of her work, including streaming audio and video samples may be found at both SOUNZ (the Centre for New Zealand Music) and the Canadian Music Centre websites.
