= Gao Ping =

Chinese composer

Gao Ping (高平; born Chengdu, 1970) is a Chinese composer and professor of composition at Chinese University of Hong Kong-Shenzhen School of Music. He taught composition at the Conservatory of Music at Capital Normal University in Beijing, the University of Canterbury, New Zealand School of Music (Wellington), and University of Waikato in Hamilton, New Zealand.

== Early life ==
He was born in Sichuan province where he grew up as a young pianist at Sichuan Conservatory in Chengdu, Gao Ping was affected by China's concurrent transformation from a collective to a market economy.

== Career ==
Gao gained his D.Music in composition from the University of Cincinnati. He is professor in composition at the Conservatory of Music at Capital Normal University in Beijing. He holds a guest professorship at the China Conservatory. From 2005 he taught composition at the School of Music at Canterbury University in Christchurch, New Zealand. He is a research associate in the Department of Music at Waikato University. His 1988 China Record Company album Jazz in China was one of the first domestic jazz-classical albums released in China.

Beijing-based musicologist and professor Li Xi'an referred to Gao Ping as a member of the "sixth generation" of Chinese composers. His last chamber music release on Naxos was described by a German critic as "music which wants to be heard with ears of a child, full of wonder and amazement…deep and vulnerable."

In later works, Gao returned to China as a creative theme. Works such as Piano Quintet Mei Lan Zhu Ju (2009) and The Four Not-Alike for multi-function pianist and Chinese instruments (2012) reflect his fusion of Western and Eastern idioms.

In 2026 Outside the Window his album of piano music played by Michael Houstoun was released.

== Recognition ==
- Composers Association of New Zealand Trust Fund award (2010).

== Selected works ==
- Distant Voices (1999) - for piano
- Shuo Shu Ren or The Storyteller (2001) - for sextet
- Sonata No 2 for cello and piano (2001)
- Two Soviet Love Songs for Vocalising Pianist (2003)
- The Mountain for orchestra (2005)
- Piano Concerto No.1 (2007)
- Wild Cherry Tree—symphonic songs for soloists and orchestra(2012–2017)
- Four Not-alike for multi-function pianist and Chamber Orchestra (2012)
- Sonata for Piano (2015)
- Piano Concerto No.2 "Evocation of Spirits (2016)
- prayer Songs for string quartet (2019)
- Searching for the Mountain for piano trio (2021)
- Outside the Window (2026)
