= Gillian Bibby =

New Zealand composer, pianist, writer and teacher (1945–2023)

Gillian Bibby MNZM
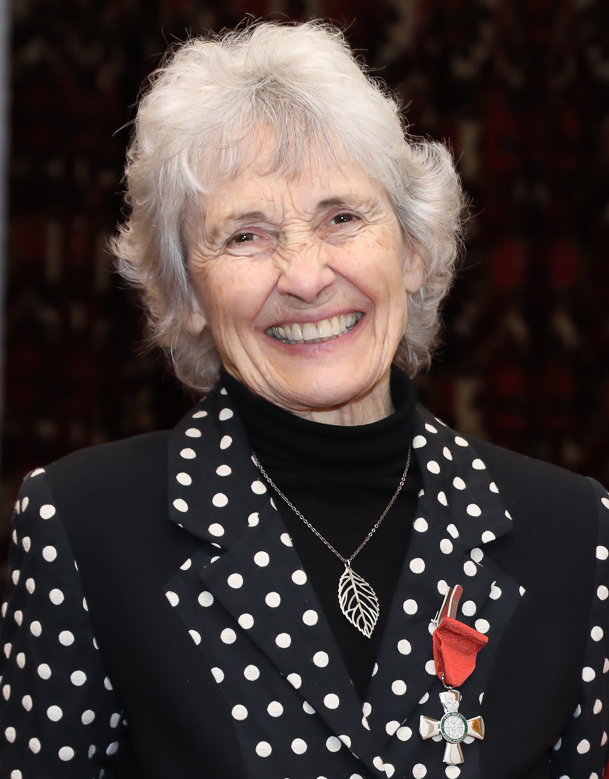
- Bibby in 2020
- Born: Gillian Margaret Bibby; 31 August 1945; Lower Hutt, New Zealand
- Died: 7 August 2023 (aged 77); Wellington, New Zealand
- Occupations: Composer; pianist; music teacher

Gillian Margaret Bibby MNZM (31 August 1945 – 7 August 2023) was a New Zealand composer, pianist, writer and teacher.

Bibby was born in Lower Hutt, New Zealand on 31 August 1945, the daughter of the Reverend Lawrence Vincent Bibby and Margaret Valerie Bibby (née Davidson). She studied at the University of Otago and Victoria University of Wellington with Douglas Lilburn. She continued her studies in Berlin and Cologne with Aloys Kontarsky, Mauricio Kagel and Karlheinz Stockhausen.

In 1976, Bibby returned to New Zealand to take up a two year Mozart Fellowship at the University of Otago in Dunedin.

Bibby relocated to Wellington in 1978 and worked as a pianist, composer, music teacher and university lecturer.

Bibby was active in several music-related organisations, serving as president and chair, and founded the CHAMPS Trust to offer opportunities for youth in music. She was awarded the Philip Neill prize in composition, the Kranichsteiner prize in composition and the Darmstadt prize for new music.

In the 2020 New Year Honours, Bibby was appointed a Member of the New Zealand Order of Merit, for services to music and music education.

Bibby died in Wellington on 7 August 2023, at the age of 77.

== Works ==
Selected works include:

- 11 Characters in Search of a Composer for orchestra or military band
- Aie! A Conversation Piece for tape
- Musik für drei Hörer (Music for 3 Listeners) for clavichord, voice, and percussion
- Sanctuary of Spirits, children's opera
- The Beasts, song cycle of 6 songs and 5 snatches
- You can't kiss the Tummy of a Caged Lion: Pavane pour un genre defunt for voices and chamber ensemble

Her music has been recorded and issued on CD, including:

- Life, Love and Death
- The Songs of the Morning: a story of music in early Antarctica
- Douglas Lilburn: Salutes to Poet
