= Nigel Keay =

New Zealand composer

Nigel Keay (born 1955) is a New Zealand composer. He has been a freelance musician since 1983 working as a composer, violist, and violin teacher. Nigel Keay has held the following composer residencies: Mozart Fellowship, University of Otago 1986 and 1987, Nelson School of Music 1988 and 89, Auckland Philharmonia Orchestra 1995.

Keay was born in Palmerston North. Between 1983 and 1995, he received several grants from the Arts Council of New Zealand for various commissions, one of them being a one-act opera At the Hawk’s Well 1. His music, which ranges from solo and chamber music combinations to full symphony orchestra, has sometimes been driven by literary and philosophical ideas. Throughout his career he has wherever possible played in or directed his own works. He became an Associate-Violist with the Auckland Philharmonia Orchestra in 1994.

Nigel Keay moved to France in 1998 and lives now in Paris where he continues to work as a freelance composer and violist. In 2001, his Viola Concerto 2 was performed at the 29th International Viola Congress in Wellington by the Chamber Orchestra of the New Zealand Symphony Orchestra conducted by Marc Taddei with Franck Chevalier as viola soloist. In 2002 he was commissioned by Radio France to compose a work for multiple broadcasts on its France Musiques and France Culture stations (Tango Suite 3). The pianist Jeffrey Grice performed his work for solo piano, the dancer leads the procession4, at the Salle Gaveau, Paris in February 2007. Between 2003 and 2005 he gave multiple performances of his String Quartet No.2 in Paris and Bavaria with his own group, Quatuor Aphanès.

In 2006 Nigel Keay created the ensemble Orchestre 2021 6 with the conductor and pianist Elizabeth Askren.

== Selected works ==
Stage

- At the Hawk's Well, Opera in 1 act (1992); based on the play by W. B. Yeats

Orchestral

- Movement (1985)
- Three Images of Java, Symphony for string orchestra (1989)
- Ritual Dance of the Unappeasable Shadow, Symphonic Poem (1993)
- Fanfare (1995)
- Symphony in Five Movements (1996)
- Serenade for Strings (2002)
- Diversions for chamber orchestra (2003)

Concertante

- Diffractions for piano and chamber orchestra (1987)
- Viola Concerto (2000)

Chamber music

- Variations for violin and piano (1982)
- String Quartet No. 1 (1983)
- Triptych for trumpet, horn and trombone (1988)
- Piano Quartet (1986)
- Derivation 3 for violin solo (1990)
- Introduction & Allegro, Sextet for flute, clarinet (bass clarinet), bass trombone, violin, viola and double bass (1995)
- String Quartet No. 2 (1995)
- Variations on a Theme from "At the Hawk's Well", Trio in One Movement for violin, cello and piano (2001)
- Diversions for oboe, clarinet, violin, viola and double bass (2003)
- Terrestrial Mirror for flute, viola and harp (2004)
- Adagietto Antique, Trio for clarinet, viola and piano (2009)
- Visconti Variations, Duo for violin and viola (2008)
- Sonata for oboe and piano (2011)
- Double Jeu for 2 violas (2012)
- Allusions for Clarinet Solo (2013)
- Prelude for Cello and Piano (2013)
- Introduction and Tarantella for Violin & Piano (2014)
- Moderato à cent d'huîtres for Viola and Piano (2014)
- Souffle coupé for Wind Quintet (2015)
- Le Loup et l'Agneau for Piano and Narrator (2017)
- Nocturne (Havrincourt 1918) for baritone saxophone and double bass (2017)
- Sitting in the Ruins for two oboes and bassoon (2018)
- Labyrinthe for flute and viola (2018)
- Two-Step Distance a duo for two violins (2020)

Piano

- Four Piano Pieces (1983)
- Variations (1985)
- Interlude (1988)
- the dancer leads the procession (1999)
- Little Tango Suite, 3 Short Piano Pieces (2003–2004)

Organ

- Tectonics (2016)

Vocal

- Vocalise for soprano, vibraphone, violin, viola and cello (1979)
- Tango Suite for contralto and string quintet (string quartet and double bass) (2002)
