= Chris Cree Brown =

New Zealand composer

Christopher John Cree Brown (born 25 July 1953) is a New Zealand sonic artist and composer of orchestral and electroacoustic works. Now a freelance composer he was an associate professor of music at the University of Canterbury until 2018.

== Early life and education ==
Cree Brown was born on 25 July 1953 in Christchurch, New Zealand. He attended the University of Canterbury, first studying commerce and then switching to music. He gained his BA and a BMus (Hons) in 1977. Before studying music he was influenced by classical music but at university he was exposed to broader influences including Stockhausen, Lilburn and electroacoustic music.

== Career ==
Cree Brown was the Mozart Fellow, a composer in residence position at the University of Otago, in 1980 and 1983. He lectured part–time at Otago in electronic music in 1980. In 1988 he became a full–time lecturer at the University of Canterbury.

In 2018 after leaving his position as associate professor of music at the University of Canterbury Cree Brown received a James Wallace Residency from the University of Otago. He took up a short-term teaching position at the Musikhochschule in Lübeck, Germany in 2019.

== Work ==
In 1990–2000 Cree Brown was one of the artists selected to participate in the Artists to Antarctica Programme, a scheme in which artists visited Antarctica and created works to share their insights and raise public awareness of the continent. He composed an orchestral piece Icescape and a sonic art piece Under Erebus. The latter incorporates the sounds of Antarctica: ice cracking and shattering, wind, seals and birds, and human activity. He also created a sound track to accompany a sculpture by Virginia King. Cree Brown and King produced a video Antarctic Heart of their work in the Antarctic. He has often incorporated other artistic disciplines into his work, usually visual or sculptural but also theatrical and performance e.g. In Sympathy (1981) and Piece for Anzart (1985). He created A Black Painting (1979) an electroacoustic accompaniment to paintings by the artist Ralph Hotere which expressed his opposition to sporting contact with South Africa.

Cree Brown's work Phoenix was premiered by the Christchurch Symphony Orchestra in 2019 at the first concert in the auditorium of the Christchurch Town Hall which had been rebuilt after the 2011 earthquake. The name of the work refers to the phoenix rising from the ashes. It incorporates the sounds of Aeolian harps, an instrument he has used frequently in his works.

Cree Brown has stated that there are three reasons for composing music: political (how the world could change), for aesthetic pleasure and his own motivation of 'having something to say'. Several of Cree Brown's works have political and historical themes: Aramoana, Black and White, Pilgrimage to Gallipoli, No Ordinary Sun. Aramoana (1980) was about the Aramoana smelter and was an electroacoustic piece with sculptural installation. Cree Brown's convictions against South African apartheid stimulated him to write Black and White (1987) for orchestra and tape about the 1981 Springbok rugby tour of New Zealand; despite being written and performed six years after the tour it proved controversial with some audience and New Zealand Symphony Orchestra players walking out of the performance. Pilgrimage to Gallipoli (2009) commemorated World War 1 and included sounds recorded by Cree Brown in 1994 and 2001 at ANZAC commemorations at Gallipoli. Cree Brown used his electroacoustic work No Ordinary Sun (2014) to express his anti–nuclear convictions and included poet Hone Tuwhare reading his own poetry; it was performed by the Karlheinz Company.

== Awards ==
Cree Brown has received two awards from the Composers Association of New Zealand: in 1986 he received a Trust Fund award and in 2010 was awarded the KBB Citation for Services to New Zealand Music. In 2010 Inner Bellow won the SOUNZ Contemporary Award at the APRA Silver Scroll Awards.

== Selected publications ==
- Brown, C. C. (2001). 'Out of thin air.' Canzona, 2001; v.22 n.43, 26–29.
- Brown, Chris Cree (2002). The Aeolian harp project : the design of a musical sculpture for Christchurch. [Christchurch, N.Z.]: C.C. Brown. ISBN 0-473-08943-2. OCLC 156054506.
- Brown, C. C. (2003). 'Under Erebus – a composer in Antarctica.' Canzona, 2003; v.24 n.45, 32–34.
- Cree Brown, Chris (2009). Antarctica, Aeolian harps, and Gallipoli. Wellington, N.Z.: Promethean Editions. ISBN 978-0-9864592-0-7. OCLC 610200211.
