= John Ritchie (composer) =

New Zealand composer (1921–2014)

- Born: John Anthony Ritchie; 29 September 1921; Wellington, New Zealand
- Died: 29 September 2014 (aged 93); Christchurch, New Zealand
- Education: University of Otago
- Employer: University of Canterbury
- Known for: Composer, conductor, music educator
- Notable work: Concertino for Clarinet and String Orchestra (1957); Ergo Tua Rura Manebunt (1973); Aquarius: Suite No. 2 for String Orchestra (1982); Papanui Road Overture
- Relatives: Anthony Ritchie (son)

John Anthony Ritchie (29 September 1921 – 29 September 2014) was a New Zealand composer and professor of music at the University of Canterbury.

== Biography ==
Born in Wellington in 1921, Ritchie attended the University of Otago, graduating with a Diploma of Music in 1943 and a MusB the following year. He also trained as a teacher at Dunedin Teachers' College. Later, between 1956 and 1957, he undertook postgraduate study with Walter Piston at Harvard University. He was the father of composer Anthony Ritchie.

During World War II he held the rank of sub-lieutenant in the Royal New Zealand Naval Volunteer Reserve and served with the Fleet Air Arm as a pilot.

Ritchie was appointed a junior lecturer in music at Canterbury University College (now the University of Canterbury) in 1946, and rose to become head of department and professor in 1962. He also served as dean of the Faculty of Music and Fine Arts, and was deputy vice-chancellor of the university between 1977 and 1980. He retired in 1985 and was granted the title professor emeritus.

A talented clarinetist, Ritchie was, in 1958, the eponymous founder and conductor of the John Ritchie String Orchestra, which developed into the Christchurch Symphony Orchestra. As a composer his output included works for choir, instrumental ensemble, brass band and orchestra. He was the director of music for the 1974 British Commonwealth Games in Christchurch and the 1986 visit of Pope John Paul II to New Zealand.

In 1981 Ritchie was elected an individual member of the International Music Council, and in 1992 he was awarded the Composers Association of New Zealand Citation for service to New Zealand music. He was an honorary life member of the International Society for Music Education, and in 2000 he received an honorary MusD from the University of Canterbury.

Ritchie died in Christchurch in 2014 on his 93rd birthday.
