= Leonie Holmes =

New Zealand composer (born 1962)

- Born: 1962 (age 63–64); Auckland
- Occupations: Composer, university lecturer

Leonie Joyce Holmes (born 1962) is a New Zealand composer and lecturer at the University of Auckland with an interest in music education.

== Early life and education ==
Holmes was born in Auckland in 1962. She began learning piano at age six and attended Pakuranga College. She studied at the University of Auckland from 1981 to 1985, graduating with MMus in composition. Her teachers were Douglas Mews, John Rimmer and John Elmsly.

She played the violin in the Auckland Youth Orchestra.

== Career ==
In 1983–1985 Holmes attended the Nelson Young Composers' Workshops and was its first composer-in-residence in 1986. In 1989 she took up a position of Composer-in-Schools working in several Auckland schools. She has been Composer-in-Residence with the Auckland Philharmonia in 1997 and with the Manukau Symphony Orchestra in 2005. In 2001 she received the Philip Neill Memorial Prize in Composition from the University of Otago.

Holmes has an interest in music education and has written for schools and community groups. She writes for orchestras, chamber groups, choirs, solo voice and instruments, and her works have been performed internationally.

Holmes has written a number of works on commission. For Just a Little Moment was commissioned by the Auckland Philharmonia Orchestra and premiered by the orchestra during a COVID-19 lockdown in November 2020. Holmes's Piano Concerto was commissioned by the Christchurch Symphony Orchestra who performed its first public premiere in October 2023. It had been recorded earlier by the New Zealand Symphony Orchestra.

As at 2021 she is a senior lecturer in composition at the University of Auckland.

== Selected works ==
- Nonette for flute, oboe, clarinet, bassoon, horn and string quartet (1984)
- Fantasia II for piano (1986)
- Four epigrams: for mandolin ensemble (1987)
- Recitative II for viola and percussion (1991)
- The estuary: for SSA choir and piano (1993) – words: A.R.D. Fairburn
- Colloquium: two flutes and guitar (1993)
- Seconds: for string orchestra (1994)
- Three songs for baritone and piano (1997)
- Chorale for brass sextet (1997)
- Silver whispers: choral suite in five movements (2004) – words: Marnie Barrell
- Tango mangle: for orchestra (2007)
- The fourth station: for solo cello (2008)
- Fanfare for Manukau: for orchestra (2008)
- Through coiled stillness (2011) – text: Leonie Holmes and Robert Wiremu
- Nocturne for solo piano (2011)
- A tedious brief scene, Bottom's dance (2011)
- Solstice (2013)
- Land pictures: for women's voices and harp (2015) – words: Anne Powell
- Where the tui sings three notes (2015) – text: Tessa Stephens
- Whim: for orchestra (2015)
- Ritual: for wind quintet (2016)
- Fragment II: for string quartet (2016)
- Dance of the Wintersmith: for violin and piano (2017)
- Murmuration: for three violins (2019)
- For Just a Little Moment (2020)
- Piano Concerto (2022)
