= Mozart Fellowship =

Musical residency in New Zealand university

The Mozart Fellowship is a composer residency attached to the Music Department of the University of Otago, one of the five Arts Fellowships at the university. It is the oldest full-time composition residency in New Zealand, and is currently the only position of its kind; the list of past fellows includes many of New Zealand's most notable composers. In 2013, Martin Lodge, Associate Professor and Convenor of the Waikato University Music Programme described the Mozart Fellowship as "New Zealand's premiere composer residency, being the longest established, best paid and most prestigious with the list of past Fellows a veritable who's who of New Zealand composers".

The 2024 Mozart Fellow is Simon Eastwood.

== History ==
The Fellowship was established in 1969 and the first appointed Mozart Fellow was Anthony Watson. It is awarded for a 12-month period, and no composer may hold the Fellowship for more than two years. Composers are also expected to spend the majority of their time based in Dunedin.

The appointed composer is paid a stipend which allows him or her to live and are given the freedom to work on projects of their own choice, although traditionally many recipients of the award have written compositions for performers within the University's Music Department or the city's orchestra Dunedin Symphony.

A reunion of past and present fellowship holders was held at the university in 2007.

== List of Mozart Fellows ==
The composers who have received this award are as follows:

- 1970–71 Anthony Watson
- 1972 John Rimmer
- 1973–74 Edwin Carr
- 1975 Larry Pruden
- 1976–77 Gillian Bibby
- 1980 Chris Cree Brown
- 1981 John Elmsly
- 1983 Chris Cree Brown
- 1984 Jonathan Besser
- 1985 Kim Dyett
- 1986–87 Nigel Keay
- 1988–89 Anthony Ritchie
- 1990–91 Martin Lodge
- 1992 Gillian Whitehead and Bruce Crossman
- 1993 Helen Bowater
- 1994–95 Christopher Marshall
- 1996 Cheryl Camm
- 1997 Jason Kaminski
- 1998 Paul Booth
- 1999 Harold Anderson
- 2000 Ross Carey
- 2001 Alison Isadora
- 2002 Michael Norris
- 2003–04 Noel Sanders
- 2005–06 Rachel Clement
- 2007 Neville Copland
- 2008–09 Chris Watson
- 2010–11 Chris Adams
- 2012 Robbie Ellis
- 2013 Samuel Holloway
- 2014–15 Jeremy Mayall
- 2016–17 Chris Gendall
- 2018–19 Dylan Lardelli
- 2020–21 Kenneth Young
- 2022–23 Sean Donnelly
- 2024–25 Simon Eastwood

== See also ==
- Frances Hodgkins Fellowship
- Robert Burns Fellowship
