= Eve de Castro-Robinson =

New Zealand

- Born: 1956
- Occupation: Composer

Eve de Castro-Robinson (born 9 November 1956 in London, England) is a New Zealand composer, professor and graphic designer. Her compositions include orchestral, vocal, chamber and electroacoustic works. She studied at the University of Auckland, where in 1991 she became the first person to receive a DMus from the University. She is Associate Professor of Composition at the University of Auckland.

A "de Castro-Robinson Portrait" concert was held at the New Zealand International Festival of the Arts in Wellington in 2004 and a 50th birthday concert was held at the University of Auckland in 2006. Besides teaching and composing, she also reviews music, speaks and broadcasts on music. She has published a number of professional articles in Canzona and Music in New Zealand. De Castro-Robinson is a member of the SOUNZ board of trustees. She has been Secretary of the Composers Association of New Zealand, Convenor of the Nelson Composers’ Workshop, and currently directs the Karlheinz Company, the University of Auckland's resident contemporary music ensemble.

== Honours and awards ==
- Philip Neill Memorial Prize 1987
- Auckland Philharmonia Composer in Residence 1991
- Philip Neill Memorial Prize 1993
- SOUNZ Contemporary Award 1998
- CANZ Trust Fund Award 2000
- Finalist - SOUNZ Contemporary Award 2006
- SOUNZ Contemporary Award 2007
- Best Classical Artist, Vodafone NZ Music Awards 2018, The Gristle of Knuckles (Rattle Records)

== Works ==
- Chaos of Delight (1998) for chamber ensemble
- Other Echoes (2000) for orchestra
- a pink-lit phase for flute, viola and harp
- Chaos of Delight III (2006) for women's voices
- Five Responses for women's voices, male speaker, and mixed ensemble
- Len Songs for mezzo-soprano, clarinet, violin and piano
- Noah's Ark for large chamber ensemble
- Other echoes (2001), fanfare for orchestra
- Releasing the Angel (2011), Atoll label, for cello and orchestra
- Len Lye (2012) 90-minute five-act chamber opera, libretto by Roger Horrocks (Maidment Theatre, Auckland)
- Split the Lark for violin and piano
- Triple Clarinet Concerto for E flat clarinet, B flat clarinet, bass clarinet and orchestra
- Tumbling Strains for violin and cello
- Hour of Lead (2024) for orchestra

Some of her scores have been published by Waiteata Press, Wellington.

== Discography ==
- 2018: The Gristle of Knuckles (Rattle Records RAT-D078)
- 2016: I Stayed A Minute (Rattle Records RAT-D063)
- 2013: Other echoes (Atoll Records ACD300)
- 2011: Releasing the Angel (Atoll Records ACD141) Finalist in the 2012 NZ Music Awards, Best Classical Album
- 1998: Chaos of Delight (Atoll Records A9806)
