= Gillian Whitehead =

New Zealand composer (born 1941)

Dame Gillian Whitehead DNZM
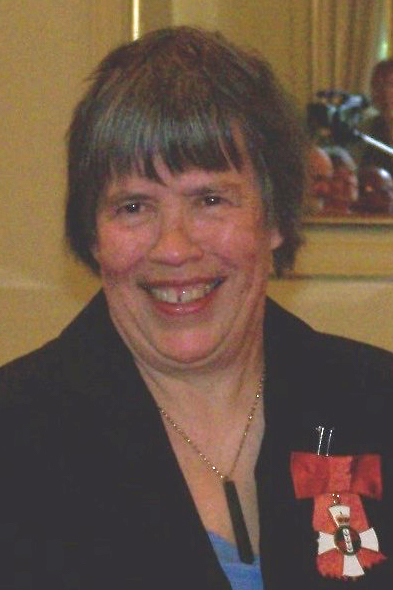
- Whitehead in 2008
- Born: Gillian Karawe Whitehead; 23 April 1941 (age 85); Hamilton, New Zealand
- Occupation: Classical composer

Dame Gillian Karawe Whitehead DNZM (born 23 April 1941) is a New Zealand composer. She is of Māori Ngāi Te Rangi descent. Her Māori heritage has been an important influence on her composing.

== Early life ==
Whitehead was born in Hamilton in 1941. The daughter of Ivan and Marjorie Whitehead, she is of Ngāi Te Rangi descent. Her father was a music teacher and conductor of the Waipu Choral Society and her mother played the piano. She began composing early, making clear to her mother at age 17 that she wanted to be a composer.

== Education ==
She studied at the University of Auckland from 1959 to 1962, and Victoria University of Wellington in 1963, graduating BMus(Hons) in 1964. She then studied composition at the University of Sydney with Peter Sculthorpe from 1964–65, graduating MMus in 1966. That same year she attended a composition course given by Peter Maxwell Davies and in 1967 travelled to England to continue studying with him.

== Career ==
Whitehead worked in London composing and copying music for two years and then with the assistance of a New Zealand Arts Council grant worked in Portugal and Italy from 1969 to 1970. For the next seven years she continued freelance composing, principally based in the United Kingdom. From 1978 to 1980, she held an English academic post, having been during that time Composer in Residence for Northern Arts attached to Newcastle University.

In 1981, she returned to New South Wales, to join the staff of the Composition School at the Sydney Conservatorium of Music. She was Head of Composition for four years. She left the Conservatorium in 1996. Since then she has spent most of her time in New Zealand, mostly in Dunedin.

In 1989 she was Composer in Residence at Victoria University of Wellington. She took up the Mozart Fellowship at the University of Otago in 1992. During 2000 and 2001 she was Composer in Residence at the Auckland Philharmonia. Her major orchestral work, The Improbable Ordered Dance, written during the Residency won the 2001 SOUNZ Contemporary Award.

From 1998 to 2003 she was president of the Composers Association of New Zealand. In 2005–2006 she was the Composer in Residence at the New Zealand School of Music at Victoria University. She was the first Composer in Residence to stay at the Lilburn Residence.

In 2009 Whitehead was one of the 2009 Henderson Arts Trust artists-in-residence in Alexandra.

== Compositions ==
Whitehead has written a wide range of music including works for solo, chamber, choral, orchestral and operatic forces, most of them direct commissions from performers and funding organisations. A number of her works have been recorded for commercial release, including a CD of her chamber works by Wai-te-ata Music Press and a recording of her opera, Outrageous Fortune.

Outrageous Fortune (1998) was commissioned by the Otago Commemorative Opera Group, Te Atamira Whakamaumahara to mark 150 years since the founding of the city of Dunedin and Otago province. Another opera, The Art of Pizza (1995), was commissioned by Chamber Mode, a Melbourne opera group. Set in a Sydney shopping mall it looks at the situation of refugees.

The New Zealand Symphony Orchestra commissioned Whitehead to write a piece to commemorate the 250th anniversary of Captain Cook's arrival in New Zealand; she produced Turanga-nui (2018), referring to the name of Gisborne and Cook's landfall there.

In 2020 she wrote a piece especially for the baroque ensemble Juilliard451 from the Juilliard School of Music in New York who toured New Zealand.

=== Influence of Māori heritage and instruments ===
Since her time in London Whitehead has used Māori themes in her work. Pakuru (1967), for baritone and ensemble, is based on Māori sayings and the seasonal cycle. She began to incorporate taonga pūoro (traditional Māori instruments) in her work in the 1990s after meeting Hirini Melbourne and Richard Nunns. Her Lilburn Lecture in 2019 examined how she uses the sounds of taonga pūoro. Other works with Māori themes include Ahotu (ō matenga) (1984), Outrageous Fortune (1998), Hineraukatauri (1999) and Hine-pu-te-hue (2001).

=== Use of magic squares ===
Whitehead has used magic squares in her composition, also used by Peter Maxwell Davies and others. She first read about them in the 1970s and used them for the next 20 years. In the 1980s when she moved to Sydney she used squares but much more freely and later pieces combined prime numbers and squares in a more integrated way. Squares remained as the starting point of her composing but later she moved to compose more instinctively. She acknowledged the process of using a systematic approach, its potential and then moving away from it.

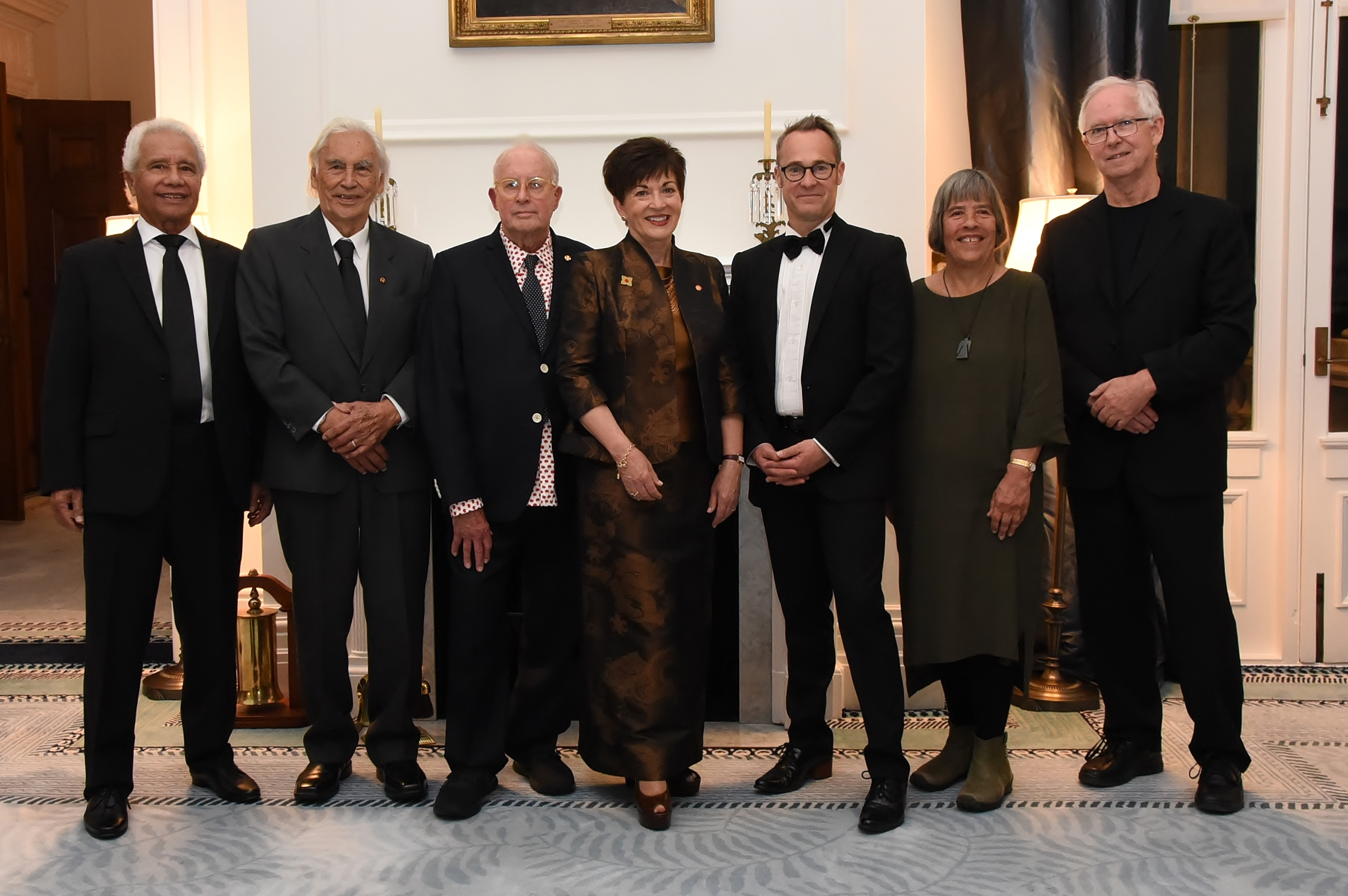
2018 Arts Foundation of New Zealand Icon Awards an event at Government House, Wellington, New Zealand

== Honours and awards ==
In the 1999 New Year Honours, Whitehead was appointed a Member of the New Zealand Order of Merit, for services to music. She has received two awards from the Arts Foundation: an Arts Foundation Laureate in 2000 and an Arts Foundation Icon in 2018. Victoria University of Wellington awarded her an honorary DMus in 2003. In 2007 she received the Composers Association KBB/CANZ Citation for Services to Music. In the 2008 Queen's Birthday Honours, she was promoted to Distinguished Companion of the New Zealand Order of Merit, also for services to music. In 2009, following the reinstatement of titular honours by the New Zealand government, Whitehead accepted redesignation as a Dame Companion of the New Zealand Order of Merit.

== Selected works ==
=== Orchestral works ===
- Resurgences (1989)
- … the improbable ordered dance … (2000)
- Turanga-nui (2017)
- Retrieving the fragility of peace (2022)

=== Operas ===
- Tristan and Iseult (1976)
- The King of the Other Country (1983) – libretto by Fleur Adcock
- The Art of Pizza (1995) – libretto by Anna Maria Dell'Oso
- Outrageous Fortune (1998)
- Iris dreaming (2016)
- Mate Ururoa (2021)

=== Vocal and instrumental works ===
- Pakuru (1967) – based on Hone Tuwhare's poem 'Thine own hands have fashioned'
- Inner Harbour (1979) – based on Fleur Adcock's poems
- Hotspur (1980) – based on Fleur Adcock's poems

=== Ensemble works ===
- At night the garden was full of voices (1977)
- Ahotu (ō matenga) (1984)
- Clouds over Mata-au (2010)
- Ad Parnassum – Purapurawhetū (2021)

== Bibliography ==
- Sanders, Noel. (2010) Moon, Tide & Shoreline: Gillian Karawe Whitehead: A Life in Music. Steele Roberts Publishers: Wellington, Aotearoa, New Zealand.
