= David Farquhar =

New Zealand composer and professor of music

David Farquhar CNZM
- Born: David Andross Farquhar; 5 April 1928; Cambridge, New Zealand
- Died: 8 May 2007 (aged 79); Wellington, New Zealand
- Education: Guildhall School of Music and Drama
- Occupations: Composer; professor of music

David Andross Farquhar CNZM (5 April 1928 – 8 May 2007) was a New Zealand composer and professor of music at Victoria University of Wellington.

== Biography ==
Farquhar was born in Cambridge, New Zealand, in 1928 but spent most of his early years in Fiji. He was educated in New Zealand, and was a pupil at St Peter's School in Cambridge and Wanganui Collegiate School. He was an accomplished sportsman and academic at both schools, captaining the cricket team in summer and hockey team in winter. He also broke many of their short- and middle-distance running records. He began his university studies in Christchurch before completing his degree at Victoria University College where he studied with Douglas Lilburn. He went to the United Kingdom where he completed a Master of Arts at the University of Cambridge, and also studied composition with Benjamin Frankel at the Guildhall School of Music in London.

On his return to New Zealand in 1953, Farquhar joined the staff of the Department of Music at Victoria University, and rose to become professor of music in 1976, retiring in 1993. He was the founder-president of the Composers Association of New Zealand in 1974 and was awarded their Citation for Services to New Zealand Music in 1984.

In the 2004 New Year Honours, Farquahar was appointed a Companion of the New Zealand Order of Merit, for services to music. He wrote numerous orchestral, choral, stage and instrumental works, songs and music for children, and has been recognised since the 1950s as being at the forefront of New Zealand composition.

Farquhar died in Wellington on 8 May 2007.

== Compositions ==
=== Ring Round the Moon ===
This music was originally commissioned by Richard Campion for the New Zealand Players' production of Ring Round the Moon, Christopher Fry's adaptation of Jean Anouilh's play L'invitation au château. In the second act a ball takes place offstage and the text specifies a large number of dances. The music was first recorded on acetate discs by an ad hoc orchestra led by Alex Lindsay; these small recordings were then played through speakers for the production, sounding very loud to the cast but filtering out more gently to the audience.

At the end of the long national tour, the cast knew the music very well and suggested to Farquhar that he should do something with it. The result, some years later, 1957, was a suite of nine dances first performed by the Alex Lindsay Orchestra. This rapidly became Farquhar's most performed piece and was commercially recorded by the Alex Lindsay Orchestra in 1962, a recording still available today as a CD reissue.

Ashley Heenan, through the NZ APRA Committee, commissioned an arrangement for full orchestra for the National Youth Orchestra to take on a tour of Europe and China in 1975. This version was shortened to six dances by leaving out the first three numbers. The music has also been used for a ballet, The Wintergarden, choreographed by Arthur Turnbull for the Royal New Zealand Ballet, and a variety of other versions exists: a Waltz Suite (1989) for string orchestra; an arrangement of the original Dance Suite (1992) for violin and piano; as well as shorter arrangements for both brass band and concert band.

=== Other compositions ===
- A Unicorn For Christmas, opera in three acts
- Concertino for piano and strings
- Concerto for guitar and chamber orchestra
- Concerto for Wind Quintet, for flute, oboe, clarinet, bassoon and horn
- In Despite Of Death, a song cycle for baritone and piano
- Magpies and other birds, settings of three poems by Denis Glover for vocal quartet
- No-one and anyone, a setting of anyone lived in a pretty how town by E. E. Cummings for vocal sextet
- Partita, for piano
- Ring Round the Moon, Dance Suite for small orchestra
- Scherzo for orchestra
- String Quartet
- Suite, five-movement work for guitar – Prelude, Capriccio, Ostinato, Rondino and Epilogue.
- Symphony No. 1 for orchestra
- Symphony No. 2 for orchestra
- The Islands, song cycle for SATB choir
- Three Cilla McQueen Songs, for mezzo-soprano and piano
- Three Improvisations, for piano
