= Jack Body =

NZ composer, ethnomusicologist, photographer and teacher (1944–2015)

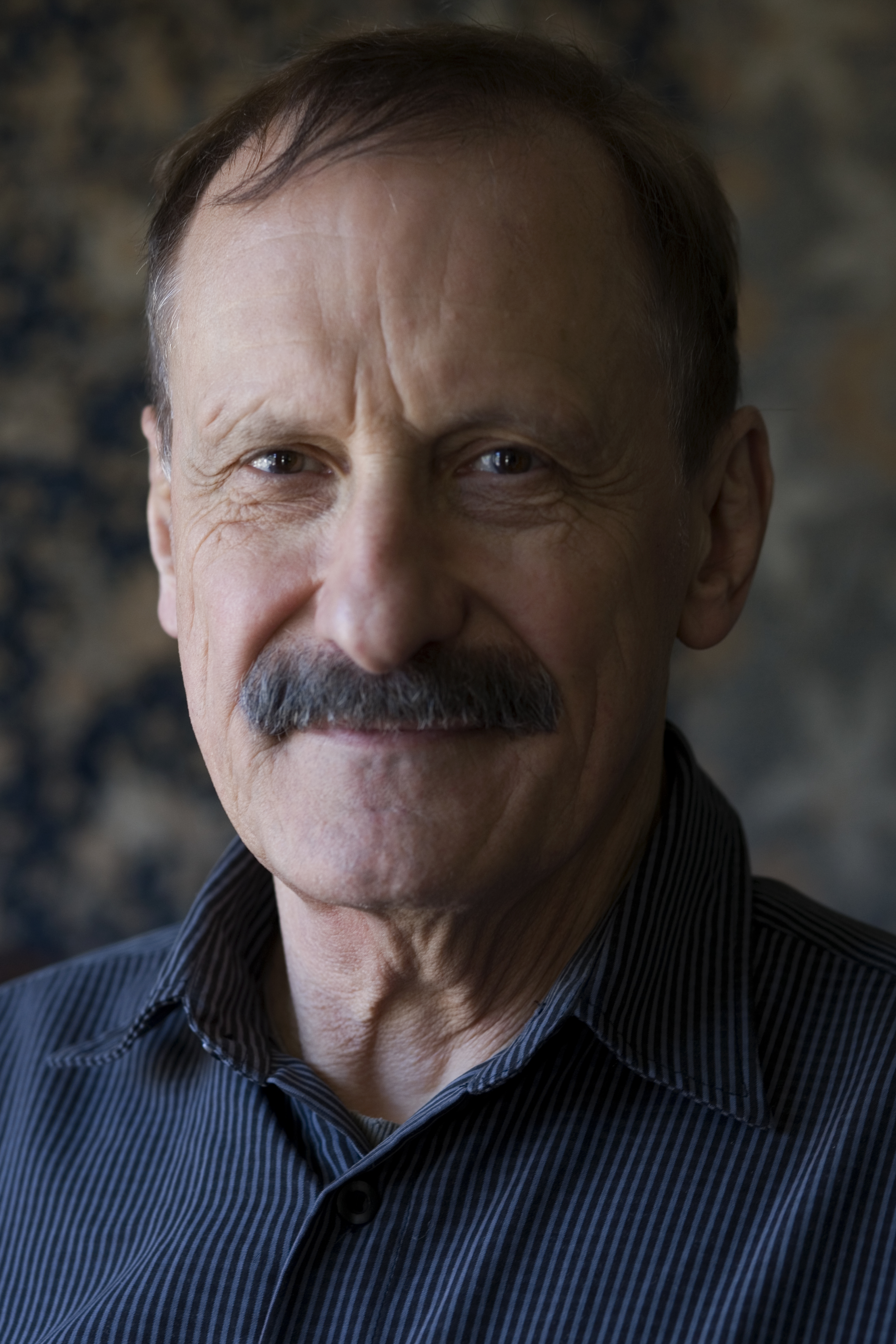
- Body in 2011

Background information
- Born: John Stanley Body; 7 October 1944; Te Aroha, New Zealand
- Died: 10 May 2015 (aged 70) Wellington, New Zealand
- Occupations: Composer; photographer; teacher; ethnomusicologist
- Label: Atoll Records
- Website: www.jackbody.com

John Stanley Body ONZM (7 October 1944 – 10 May 2015) was a New Zealand composer, ethnomusicologist, photographer, teacher, and arts producer. As a composer, his work comprised concert music, music theatre, electronic music, music for film and dance, and audio-visual gallery installations. A deep and long-standing interest in the music of non-Western cultures – particularly South-East Asian – influenced much of his composing work, particularly his technique of transcribing field recordings. As an organiser of musical events and projects, Body had a significant impact on the promotion of Asian music in New Zealand, as well as the promotion of New Zealand music within the country and abroad.

In 2015 he was named a New Zealand Arts Icon, the highest award given by the New Zealand Arts Foundation and the first composer to be so honoured. In November 2020, Body's status as an Arts Icon was suspended by the Arts Foundation following allegations that Body had sexually abused male students at Victoria University. In January 2022, following a formal apology by the university to these students, the Arts Foundation confirmed that his award was no longer recognised by the organisation.

== Biography ==
Jack Body was born 7 October 1944 in Te Aroha, a town in the North Island farming district of the Waikato. Both parents came from farming families; his father, Stan, was an earthmoving contractor. Seeing his older sisters take piano lessons, Body convinced his parents to let him follow suit, and began piano lessons from William Cranna, a graduate of the Royal Scottish Academy of Music and employee of the local power board. Body's first composing efforts as a child were re-composing his prescribed Royal Schools exercises and performing them at end-of-year piano recitals in the local church hall.

Body attended secondary school as a boarder at King's College, Auckland. There, his interest in both music and painting was kindled amidst the school's dynamic musical life under the leadership of music teacher L C M Saunders, with whom Body took piano and organ lessons. On completing secondary school, he applied for the Elam School of Fine Arts but instead chose to study music at the University of Auckland, beginning a Bachelor of Music in 1963. At that time composition was not offered as a course of study at an undergraduate level; nevertheless, Body composed prolifically during his undergraduate years. While studying at the University of Auckland, Body also took organ lessons with Peter Godfrey and sang in the choir of St. Mary's Anglican Cathedral, Parnell. In 1965 he was appointed organist and choirmaster of St. Aidan's Anglican Church in Remuera.

After graduating his BMus with first class Honours, Body began his Masters of Music in 1966, studying composition with Ron Tremain in his first year and Robin Maconie in his second. He completed his MMus, along with an additional teaching degree, in 1967. As a postgraduate student, Body began corralling artists and musicians for events and projects. A considerable crowd of avant-garde Auckland artists gravitated around his Birdwood Crescent flat in Parnell. In 1967, while president of the New Zealand Chapter of ISCM (International Society for Contemporary Music), Body organised a festival called Aucklanders and the Arts in the University of Auckland Student Union Building.

An Arts Council Grant in 1969 enabled Body to travel to Cologne to study at Mauricio Kagel's Ferienkurse für Neue Musik. With an extension of the Arts Council Grant, Body was able to study at the Institute of Sonology in Utrecht, the Netherlands, from 1969 to 1970. Returning home in 1970 via travels through Greece, North India, and Jakarta sparked Body's lifelong fascination with non-Western musical traditions.

On his return to New Zealand, Body took up a teaching position at Tawa College in Wellington, but resigned after one year to focus on freelance composition projects. Body travelled to Bali and Java for four months in 1974, after which the Akademi Musik Indonesia in Yogyakarta (now in the Indonesian Arts Institute), invited him to return in 1976 as a guest lecturer. Body's return trip to Yogyakarta was supported by the New Zealand Ministry of Foreign Affairs. Although Body was teaching Western music practice at the Akademi, his experience living in Yogyakarta enabled him to learn about the region's traditional music, as well as make numerous field recordings of local music and environmental sounds.

After a year in Yogyakarta, Body met linguist Yono Soekarno (or Sukarno) in an Indonesian post office and who was to be his partner for his remaining 40 years. Body was gay; fellow composer Ross Harris said that Body "was a gay artist.... that was a basic position from which he did his work".

At the end of 1977, Body and Soekarno returned to Wellington, where Body worked as a freelance composer while tutoring at Victoria University and running workshops in secondary schools. 1980 saw the retirement of Douglas Lilburn as composition professor at Victoria University (now the New Zealand School of Music); Body applied for and was offered the position. Body remained on the composition faculty of Victoria University until his retirement in 2009.

Body lived out the rest of his life in Wellington, amidst countless travels overseas. His first trip to China was in 1985, whereupon he began formulating ideas for what would become his opera Alley, based on the life of Rewi Alley, a New Zealand political activist in China.

Celebratory concerts in honour of Body's 70th birthday were held at both the University of Auckland and Victoria University Wellington in April 2014. After a long battle with cancer, Body died 10 May 2015 in Mary Potter Hospice, Wellington, the day after his meditation on mortality "Cries: A Border Town" (originally entitled "Cries from the Border") received its Australian premiere at the 2015 Canberra International Music Festival. A memorial concert honouring his life was held at St. Andrews-on-the-Terrace, Wellington, on 24 May 2015.

== Music and work ==
Body's earliest works, such as choral pieces Ave Maria Gratia Plena (1965), People Look East (1965), and Carol to St. Stephen (1975) reflect Body's early training as a church musician. His travel to South-East Asia in the early 1970s, where he encountered local musical traditions, significantly re-formed his compositional language. Many of Body's works are scored for both Western and non-Western instruments such as gamelan, sheng, and gangsa. Resonance Music (1974), for electric guitar and 6 percussionists, features gamelan; its premiere by the New Zealand Broadcasting Corporation Symphony Orchestra made first use of the set of gamelan gifted to the orchestra in May 1974 by the Indonesian ambassador to New Zealand.

Field recordings made by Body in South-East Asia formed the source material for many of his electronic and electro-acoustic pieces, such as Musik Dari Jalan (1975), Musik Anak-Anak (1978), Fanfares (1981), and Interior (1987). Intimate Histories no. 1 (2005) features a personal oral history of Yono Soekarno, Jack's partner, coloured by field recordings which Body made in Soekarno's Indonesian hometown in 1977 and 1988.

As well as creating tape pieces from these field recordings, Body also developed a process of 'double-transcription', which he described as transcribing the essence of the musical source in the recording in such a way that would be playable by Western musicians. Whenever possible, Body used field recordings he himself had made, and used the original music in its entirety. Works employing these transcription techniques include Melodies for Orchestra (1983), commissioned by the New Zealand Symphony Orchestra to mark the 100th anniversary of the University of Auckland, Three Transcriptions (1988), commissioned by the Kronos Quartet, and the orchestral work Pulse (1995), which combines transcribed material from the Baining people of East New Britain, Papua New Guinea, with fragments from symphonic works by Beethoven, Berlioz, and Stravinsky.

Several of Body's works stake out a decidedly political stance. Little Elegies (1985) was commissioned by the New Zealand Symphony Orchestra to celebrate the 25th anniversary of television broadcasting in New Zealand. Rather than marking the occasion with a celebration of televised communication, Body intended for the work, which featured a video reel, to critique television's sanitisation of global events, trauma, and suffering.

A major work in Body's career is his opera Alley, premiered at the 1998 New Zealand International Festival of the Arts. Alley is based on the life of Rewi Alley, a New Zealand-born writer, political activist, and member of the Chinese Communist Party who lived and taught in China from the late 1920s until his death in 1987. With a libretto co-written with Geoff Chapple, Alley's biographer, the opera featured Gansu folk singers Ji Zheng-Zhu and Li Gui-Zhou, Beijing's Huaxia Chamber Ensemble, and a small orchestra of New Zealand musicians. A last-minute funding cut left the opera in perilous straits, but an eleventh-hour fundraising effort by Body and Chapple secured its performance.

One recurring theme in Body's work is the music of non-Western cultures; another is non-normative sexual identity. Body's music-theatre piece Songs & Dances of Desire (2013), written while Auckland Philharmonia Composer-in-Residence, is based on the life of Carmen Rupe, an anti-discrimination and AIDS activist as well as the first Māori drag performer. The work features three vocalists: a counter-tenor performing Carmen's arias from Bizet's eponymous opera, a female vocalist singing in Māori, and an operatic mezzo-soprano singing in Spanish. The poems sung by the two female vocalists are by female poets from around the world which have been translated from their original language into English, and then re-translated into either Māori or Spanish.

In addition to concert music, Body composed prolifically for screen. He wrote the theme music for television drama The Longest Winter (1974), New Zealand's first Māori language TV drama Uenuku (1974), and New Zealand's first soap opera, Close to Home (1975). Body's first feature film soundtrack was for Vincent Ward's Vigil (1984). Body co-wrote with John Gibson the soundtrack to another Ward film, Rain of the Children (2008).

Body was also an active art photographer, though untrained, whose unconventional work was shown in several New Zealand galleries. The Male Nude Series (1983) featured male nudes in vibrant colours, created through manipulations of the film negatives. Using a scalpel, nail-file, felt-tip pen and even ball-point pen, Body worked the images by scratching and re-colouring to evoke a painterly quality. The audio-visual installation Runes (1984), commissioned by the Wellington Art Gallery, juxtaposed re-coloured photographs of graffiti in public toilets with recordings made in toilets of running water.

== Legacy ==
Besides his work as a composer, Body's activities as an ambitious organiser and curator of musical events made an enormous mark both on New Zealand's composing community as well as on the cultural life of the country. Some of Body's earlier projects were the Sonic Circuses, the first of which took place in Wellington in March 1974, commissioned by the New Zealand Broadcasting Corporation and the New Zealand Students' Arts Council. Loosely inspired by John Cage's Musicircus, the 6-hour-plus event featured New Zealand music performed across eight different venues within the Victoria University Student Union building. A second Sonic Circus followed in 1975.

As an ethnomusicologist, Body published a number of CDs of traditional Asian music. Indonesian music is documented in Music for Sale: Street Musicians of Yogyakarta (OMCD 006, and TC HLS-91), Music of Madura (CD ODE 1381) and Jemblung: Sung Narrative Traditions (PAN 2048CD). South of the Clouds, a 4-CD set released on Ode Records, documented rare field recordings of Chinese ethnomusicologist Zhang Xingrong.

Body's facilitation of international exchanges played a significant role in promoting Asian music and musicians in New Zealand. In late 1974 Body assisted ethnomusicologist Allan Thomas in bringing from Cirebon, West Java to New Zealand the country's first set of gamelan. Body later managed the Victoria University Gamelan Padhang Moncar (gamelan orchestra) for many years, during which time he commissioned several new works for the gamelan orchestra. Also while on the composition faculty at Victoria University, Body established a residency inviting musicians from regions in South-East Asia (among others, West Java, Bali, Kalinga, and Minangkabau) to work closely with the university's performers and composers. The year 2000 saw the 25th anniversary of Gamelan in New Zealand; to mark the occasion, Body co-organised BEAT, an international gamelan festival with over 100 international participants.

Body was an advocate for New Zealand music and composers. In 1975, Body released a three-LP set of New Zealand electroacoustic music, New Zealand Electronic Music (Kiwi-Pacific LP, SLD 44–46), realised in the electronic music studios of Victoria University. In subsequent years he would edit over twenty CDs of New Zealand music. In 1981, at Douglas Lilburn's behest, Body re-activated the then-dormant Wai-te-ata Music Press, a publisher of New Zealand musical scores which Lilburn had founded. Body was editor of Wai-te-ata Music Press from 1981 to 2013, during which time the press became the largest publisher of New Zealand music. Body founded the Nelson Composers' Workshop in 1982, an ongoing annual gathering of young, emerging and established New Zealand composers where new works are performed and critiqued. He promoted New Zealand music in the international sphere, serving for many years on the executive committee of the Asian Composers' League (ACL). He was artistic director of Asia-Pacific Festivals & Conferences in 1984, 1992, and 2007: ten-day events juxtaposing traditional and contemporary music of New Zealand and the Asia-Pacific region. In 2002 he curated a series of five concerts of New Zealand music at the Ijsbreker in Amsterdam.

In 2011, Body embarked on a project to commission new works from New Zealand and Chinese composers for the traditional Chinese instruments of the Forbidden City Orchestra, working jointly with the New Zealand String Quartet. These works were premiered in Beijing in December 2013 with subsequent performances in Auckland and Wellington in March 2014.

== Allegations of sexual assault ==
In October 2020, a number of former students at the New Zealand School of Music reported being sexually assaulted by Body, after being asked by Victoria University to consider donating to a memorial fund in his name. Victoria University said in response that, although no direct allegations had been made to the university, it would temporarily remove mentions of the memorial fund from its website "in recognition of the serious nature of these allegations" and investigate further.

In November 2020, the university said that it had been approached by former students who had given "very credible accounts" of abuse. The university said that it planned to work with survivors to design a restorative justice process, which could involve formal apologies, compensation and policy changes. The Arts Foundation's chairperson Garth Gallaway also advised that it had suspended its endorsement of Body as an Arts Icon while it "awaited further information".

In January 2022, the university issued a formal apology to Body's former students, stating:

We believe the stories we have heard. We deeply apologise to our former students and staff for the harm caused during their time at the university, and for its long-standing impact on their lives.

At the same time, Gallaway confirmed that Body had been removed from the list of Arts Icons and that his award was no longer recognised by the Arts Foundation.

== Awards and recognition ==
- QEII Arts Council Grant (1969)
- Bourges Competition for Electroacoustic Music (1976, 2009)
- The KBB Citation for Services to New Zealand Music (1985)
- Guest composer at the University of Cincinnati College-Conservatory of Music (2000)
- Officer of the New Zealand Order of Merit, for services to music, education and photography (ONZM) (2001)
- New Zealand Music Awards: Classical CD of the Year (2002)
- Lilburn Trust Award for services to NZ music (2001)
- Featured composer at Other Minds Festival, San Francisco (2003)
- Featured composer at Encuentros International Festival, Buenos Aires (2004)
- Arts Foundation Laureate Awards (2004)
- Fulbright travel grant to the Festival of NZ Music in Santa Cruz, featured composer & curator (2005)
- Guest composer, Musik Hochschule, Lübeck, Germany (2006)
- Featured composer, Art Summit Indonesia, Jakarta, Indonesia (2007)
- Featured composer, 4th International Music Festival, Phnom Penh, Cambodia (2007)
- Guest composer, Brisbane Conservatory of Music, Brisbane Australia (2007)
- Featured composer, Beijing Modern Music Festival (2008)
- Featured composer, Cincinnati 08 Festival. College-Conservatory of Music, University of Cincinnati (2008)
- Qantas Film & Television Awards: Best NZ Film Score (2009)
- SOUNZ Contemporary Award finalist (2009)
- Philip Neill Memorial Prize (1965 and 2009)
- Featured composer, Foro Internacional de Música Nueva, Mexico City & Morelia (2009)
- Prize, Trivium, Bourges Competition for electroacoustic music (for Intimate History No.2 Sssteve) (2009)
- IAMIC Virtual Residence Composer (2010)
- Guest artist, Aichi University of Arts, Nagoya, Japan (2011)
- Auckland Philharmonia Composer in Residence (2012–13)
- Featured composer, Beijing Modern Music Festival (2014)
- Vodafone New Zealand Music Awards: Best Classical Album (2014)
- Arts Icon Award, Arts Foundation of New Zealand (2015) (suspended as at November 2020)

== List of works ==
Orchestral

- 23 Pages for large orchestra
- Carmen Dances for solo guitar with orchestra
- Eights on My Teaching for orchestra and narrator
- Fanfare for Bert for orchestra
- Fours on my teaching for orchestra with speaker
- Hector's Ghost for orchestra
- Hello Francois for orchestra
- Little Elegies for orchestra
- Meditations on Michelangelo for solo violin and string orchestra
- Melodies for Orchestra
- My Name is Mok Bhon for orchestra
- Palaran: Poems of Love and War for orchestra with traditional Javanese singer
- Poems of Solitary Delights for orchestra and tenor (narrator)
- Pulse for full orchestra
- Songs of Death and Desire for two mezzo-sopranos, counter-tenor, and orchestra
- Variations for small orchestra, on a tone row by Webern

Chamber

- 3 Sentimental Songs for 3 percussionists and 1 pianist
- African Strings for two guitars
- After Bach for eight violins, eight violas, and four cellos
- After Bach for four solo violas and 8 part massed violas
- BAI sanxian for string quartet
- Epicycle for string quartet
- Fire in the Belly for piano trio
- Flurry for three string quartets
- Four Haiku for prepared piano and 21 solo strings
- Meditations on Michelangelo for violin and piano
- Nocturne for cello and piano
- O Cambodia for mixed chamber sextet
- O Mensch, bewein dein Sünde gross for ondes martenot, glass harp, woodwind and strings
- Pain in the Arse for piano trio
- Paradise Regained for vibraphone and piano
- Rainforest for flute/alto flute and either piano or harp
- Saetas for string quartet (and accordion)
- The Caves of Ellora for piano and brass ensemble
- The Garden for sixteen instruments
- Three Elegies for chamber ensemble
- Three Rhythmics for piano duet
- Three Transcriptions for string quartet
- Tribute to the Blues arrangements for clarinet, violin, viola, cello, and piano
- Tribute to the Blues arrangements for thirteen piece ensemble
- Turtle Time for piano, harp, harpsichord, organ and speaker(s)
- Two Blues arranged for violin, cello and piano
- Yunnan for flute, guitar/lute, sixian, and string quartet

Vocal

- Ave Maria Gratia Plena for unaccompanied SATB
- Carol to St. Stephen for soprano, alto and tenor soloists and SATB choir
- Cries from the Border for string quartet and six voices
- Five Lullabies for SATB choir or vocal ensemble
- Fours on my teaching arranged for piano and speaker
- In Memoria Memorabila for choir
- In the Curve of Song for voice, tape, viola, flute/ piccolo and four percussionists
- Jibrail for vocal octet and gongs
- Love Sonnets of Michelangelo for soprano, mezzo-soprano, voice, and a dancer
- Make Us Merry, with Canons for Brass for three male voices with three trumpets and three trombones
- Marvel not Joseph for tenor and alto solos with SATB choir
- Music for the New Zealand Liturgy for SATB choir and organ
- Nowell (in the Lithuanian manner) Christmas carol for SA choir
- Pange Lingua Gloriosi for choir with either ondes martenot and glass harp, or gamelan
- Passio for voices, brass, woodwind and percussion
- Pater Noster for 4 soloists, choir with percussion, drums and one melody instrument
- People look East for unaccompanied SATB
- Psalm 103 for SATB choir
- Psalm 137 for SSAATTBB choir
- Psalm 150 for SATB choir
- Psalm 150 for SATB choir and percussion
- Songs my Grandmother Sang arrangements for voice and piano
- Song Cycle sound/light/image installation for voices and the sounds of wood and metal
- The New Liturgy for unaccompanied SATB
- Three Dreams & A Nightmare for vocal ensemble
- Three Love Songs for tenor, viola and cello
- Vox Populi for choir and tape
- Waiata Maori for Maori singer and ensemble
- Waiata Wahine for mezzo-soprano and chamber orchestra
- Wedding Song for Saint Cecilia for mixed choir

Solo

- 14 Stations for amplified pianist
- Aeolian Harp for solo violin
- Aeolian Harp for solo cello
- Aeolian Harp for solo viola
- Caravan for solo violin
- Five Melodies for piano
- Four Stabiles for piano
- Mazurka 40 – After Chopin for solo piano
- Sarajevo for solo piano
- The Street Where I Live a "landscape prelude" for piano and CD
- Three Old-Fashioned Songs for piano

with Eastern instruments

- A House in Bali for string quartet, gamelan, narrator and sheng (or oboe)
- After Bach for gamelan, 4 solo violas and massed violas
- Bamboo Music for 8 musicians playing bamboo instruments
- BEAT (DA) for string quartet, Chinese instrumental ensemble and tape
- Campur Sari for string quartet with Javanese musician
- Paradise Regained for piano and gangsa
- Polish Folk Dances for two clarinets in B flat, baritone saxophone, timpani and Javanese Gamelan
- Resonance Music for electric guitar and 6 percussionists
- The Emperor Speaks... for Chinese instrument ensemble

with electronics

- Arum Manis for string quartet and tape
- Duets and Choruses for tape
- Encounters for 4-track tape and group of participants
- Fanfares for tape
- Intimate History no. 1: Yono electroacoustic music
- Intimate History no. 2: ssteve a radiophonic work
- Interior for chamber septet and tape
- Jangkrik Genggong for tape
- Kryptophones for tape
- Musik Anak-Anak (Children's Music) for tape
- Musik Dari Jalan (Music from the Street) for tape
- Musik Mulut (Mouth Music) for tape
- Poi for tape
- Prelude: Azan environmental recordings
- Silence and Me for tape
- Sun and Steel (Homage to Mishama) interactive sound and image installation
- Superimpositions computer music for piano
- Tui, korimako and kokako for organ and birdsong (recorded)
- Vox Humana for tape
- Wananga i te rangi for tape

Opera/Stage

- Alley: an opera in two acts based on the life of Rewi Alley
- Invocation for SATB choirs, Cook Island choir, bells, shofar, organ, tape and orchestra
- Songs and Dances of Desire: In Memoriam Carmen Rupe for solo guitar, mezzo-soprano and counter-tenor, and orchestra

== Discography ==
CD Title	Works featured	Label
Adrianna Lis: Rozmowa / Dialogue	Rainforest	Atoll Records, ACD742
Darkness to Light: An Easter Celebration	Pange Lingua	--
Flight: music for flute and harp	Rainforest	Atoll Records, ACD709
Henry Wong Doe: Landscape Preludes	The Street Where I Live	Rattle Records, RATD046
Jack Body: Poems of Love and War	Alley, Meditations on Michaelangelo, My Name is Mok Bhon, Palaran: Poems of Love & War, Poems of Solitary Delights	Naxos, 8.573198
Jack Body: Songs of Death & Desire	Songs of Death & Desire	Atoll Records, ACD414
Jack Body: Pulse	African Strings, Campur Sari, Melodies for Orchestra, Pulse, Three Transcriptions	Rattle Records, RAT D009
Jack Body: Suara – Environmental Music from Java	--	Ode Records, Ode CD MANU 1380
New Zealand Choral Music	People Look East	Kiwi Pacific Records, CD SLD-108
New Zealand Music for Creative Dance (Volume Two)	Three Transcriptions	Cossey/Atoll Records
New Zealand National Youth Choir: Te Roopu Rangatahi Waiata o Aotearoa	Carol to St. Stephen	Ode Records, Ode Manu 1412
New Zealand String Quartet: notes from a journey	Three Transcriptions	Atoll Records, ACD 118
Now I Know: New Music for Gamelan and Winds	Polish Folk Dances	New Zealand School of Music / Gamelan Padhang Moncar & Gamelan Taniwha Jaya
NZTrio & Tray So: O Cambodia	O Cambodia	Atoll Records, ACD 541
Pink and White: New Zealand Organ Music	Tui, korimako and kokako	Atoll Records, ACD 605
Ritual Auras: Karlheinz Company	Interior	Atoll Records, ACD 842
Sacred and Profane: compositions for voices by Jack Body	Invocation, Song Cycle, Vox Humana	Ode Records / Portal CDs, Portal CD 1003
The Tudor Consort: The 'Earthquake' Mass	Psalm 137	Tudor Consort / Organism, ORG007
Under the Southern Cross: works for cello	Aeolian Harp	Ode Records, Ode Manu 1543/4
Waiteata Collection of New Zealand Music Vol. 1: A Violin and Piano Recital	Aeolian Harp	Watieata Music Press, Waiteata CD WTA001
Waiteata Collection of New Zealand Music Vol. 6: Composer Portrait: Jack Body	Five Lullbies, Flurry, Four Stabiles, Little Elegies, Love Sonnets of Michaelangelo, Three Old-Fashioned Songs, Three Rhythmics	Waitaeata Music Press, Waiteata CD WTA006
Waiteata Collection of New Zealand Music Vol. 13: NZ Piano Music for 4 Hands	Three Rhythmics	Waiteata Music Press, Waiteata CD WTA013
You Hit Him He Cry Out: Dan Poynton	Five Melodies	Rattle Records, RATD006
