= Ross Harris (composer) =

New Zealand composer and musician

Ross Talbot Harris QSM (born 1 August 1945) is a New Zealand composer, multi-instrumentalist, and music educator.

== Life and career ==
Born in Amberley, Harris was educated at the University of Canterbury before studying with Douglas Lilburn at Victoria University of Wellington. He then succeeded Lilburn as the professor of electro-acoustic music at Victoria, a position he maintained for over thirty years.

A composer with wide interests, Harris's compositions have spanned classical music works including operas, chamber music and seven symphonies, to electro-acoustic music, jazz, and rock music. He is a founding member of the Wellington-based band Free Radicals whose pioneering experiments in electro-acoustic music in the 1980s influenced the development of electronica in the 1990s. He achieved significant critical attention for his 1984 opera Waituhi: Te Ora O Te Whanau, the first opera created in the Māori language, and in the 1986 Queen's Birthday Honours, he was awarded the Queen's Service Medal for public services.

Harris was the resident composer of the Auckland Philharmonia Orchestra in 2005 and 2006; during which time he composed three symphonies for that orchestra. In 2014 he was awarded the Laureate Award by Arts Foundation of New Zealand. He has won the SOUNZ Contemporary Award from the Australasian Performing Right Association five times.

As an instrumentalist, Harris has played French horn in the New Zealand Symphony Orchestra, and accordion in the Wellington klezmer group The Kugels. He has also used many electro-acoustic instruments in his work with the Free Radicals.

In 2022 he delivered the ninth Lilburn Lecture with a lecture entitled The Endless Search for the Next Note: An Outline of a Composing Life from an Unlikely Beginning to an Unlikely Present.

Harris's eighth symphony which he wrote in 2022 as a response to the Russian invasion of Ukraine was recorded in a bomb shelter in 2026 by Ukraine's Kyiv Camerata.
