= Auckland Philharmonia =

Symphony orchestra based in Auckland, New Zealand

- Symphony orchestra
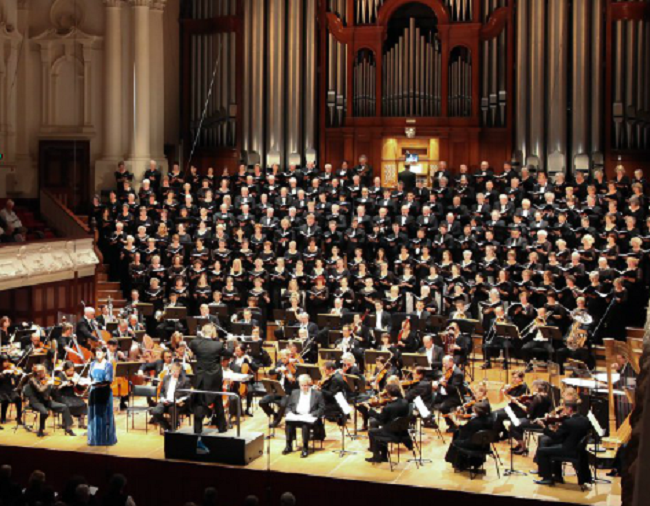
- Performing with Auckland Choral at the Auckland Town Hall, 2015
- Short name: AKL Phil
- Founded: 1980; 46 years ago
- Location: Auckland, New Zealand
- Concert hall: Auckland Town Hall
- Music director: Giordano Bellincampi
- Website: aucklandphil.nz

The Auckland Philharmonia (formerly Auckland Philharmonia Orchestra, APO) is a symphony orchestra based in Auckland, New Zealand. Its principal concert venue is the Auckland Town Hall, and it is also the accompanying ensemble for Auckland stage performances by New Zealand Opera and the Royal New Zealand Ballet. The Auckland Philharmonia's patrons are Dame Kiri Te Kanawa, Dame Rosanne Meo, Dame Jenny Gibbs and Barbara Glaser.

== History ==
In 1980, 19 musicians of the collapsed Symphonia of Auckland founded a new cooperatively run orchestra as an incorporated society, the Auckland Philharmonia Society, Inc. Local businessman Olly Newland undertook the financial risk of holding the remaining assets of the Symphonia, and organised several public rallies to garner support. He continued to serve on the management board for some years afterwards. From 1980 to 2005, the Auckland Philharmonia Society focused on artistic management of the orchestra, and delegated financial responsibility to a Board of Advisors and Management. In 2005, a structural change in the organisation produced two principal stakeholders. A charitable trust was established to manage the orchestra's capital asset fund, allowing the society to concentrate on the artistic and operational functions.

Auckland Philharmonia Orchestra logo until 2023

John Hopkins was principal conductor of the Auckland Philharmonia for 8 years. Other conductors who have worked as artistic advisors to the Auckland Philharmonia include Edvard Tchivzhel, Vladimir Verbitsky and Enrique Diemecke. Miguel Harth-Bedoya was music director of the Auckland Philharmonia from 1998 to 2005. From 2009 until 2015, the orchestra's Music Director was Eckehard Stier. In February 2015, the Auckland Philharmonia announced the appointment of Giordano Bellincampi as its next music director, effective in 2016, with an initial contract of 3 years. In February 2024, the orchestra announced the most recent extension of Bellincampi's contract as music director, through the end of 2027. Other affiliated APO conductors have included Roy Goodman, principal guest conductor from 2009 to 2011.

The Auckland Philharmonia maintains several artistic partnerships with entities such as the Auckland Festival, the Michael Hill International Violin Competition, and the Atamira dance company. Its educational work includes a partnership with the Ministry for Culture and Heritage in the Sistema Aotearoa programme (based on the El Sistema programme from Venezuela).

== Music Directors ==
- Miguel Harth-Bedoya (1998–2003)
- Eckehard Stier (2009–2015)
- Giordano Bellincampi (2016–2027)

== Composers-in-Residence ==
- 1990: Ivan Zagni
- 1991: Eve de Castro-Robinson
- 1992: Andrew Perkins
- 1993: Martin Lodge
- 1994: Helen Bowater
- 1995: Nigel Keay
- 1996: Jaz Coleman
- 1997: Leonie Holmes
- 1998: Jonathan Besser
- 1999: David Hamilton
- 2000–2001: Gillian Whitehead
- 2002–2003: John Rimmer
- 2004: Dylan Lardelli & Anthony Young
- 2005–2006: Ross Harris
- 2007–2008: Gareth Farr & Karlo Margetić (Young Composer in Residence)
- 2009: Chris Adams
- 2010–2011: John Psathas
- 2012–2013: Jack Body
- 2014–2015: Kenneth Young
- 2016–2017: Karlo Margetić

The orchestra discontinued its Composer-in-Residence position in 2018.

== See also ==
- Elect the Dead Symphony
- Category:Music commissioned by the Auckland Philharmonia Orchestra
