= John Psathas =

New Zealand composer

John Psathas ONZM
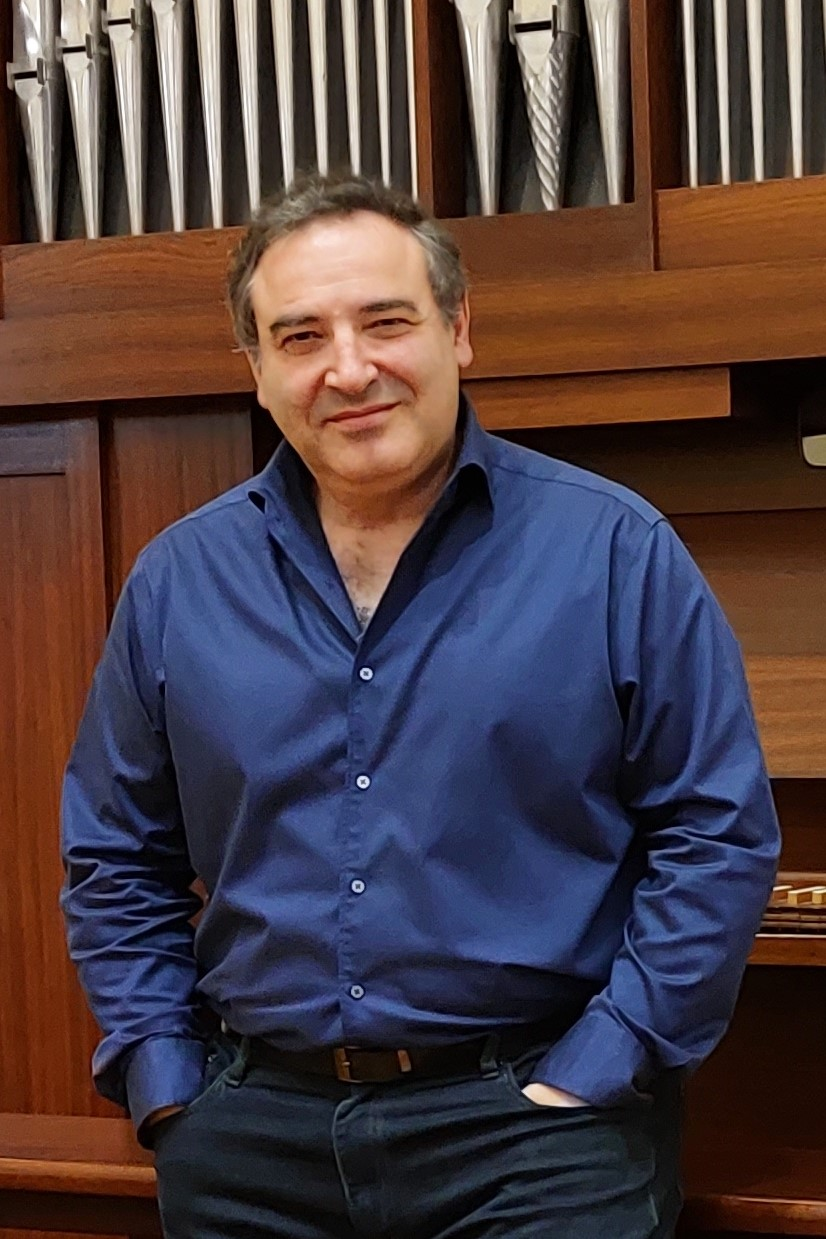
- John Psathas at St Andrew's on The Terrace, 2022
- Born: Ioannis Psathas; 1966 (age 59–60); Wellington, New Zealand
- Education: Victoria University of Wellington
- Occupation: Composer
- Website: www.jpsathas.com

John Psathas, ONZM (born Ioannis Psathas, Greek: Ιωάννης Ψάθας; 1966) is a New Zealand Greek composer. He has works in the repertoire of such high-profile musicians as Evelyn Glennie, Michael Houstoun, Michael Brecker, Joshua Redman and the New Juilliard Ensemble, and is one of New Zealand's most frequently performed composers. He has established an international profile and receives regular commissions from organisations in New Zealand and overseas.

== Early life and education ==
The son of Greek immigrant parents, Psathas grew up in Taumarunui and then Napier. He attended Napier Boys' High School and left early to study composition and piano at Victoria University of Wellington. He supported himself as a student partly by playing up to nine gigs a week in a jazz trio. Psathas studied further with composer Jacqueline Fontyn in Belgium before returning to New Zealand, where he has since lectured in music at Victoria University and continued to fulfill a busy schedule of commissions.

== Compositions and collaborations ==
Early success came with Matre's Dance in 1991, an energetic duet for percussion and piano since taken up and championed by percussionist Evelyn Glennie. This work and Drum Dances have become part of the standard repertoire for percussionists around the world. Psathas' collaboration with Evelyn Glennie has been long-standing and produced many commissioned works, including the 2001 double concerto for piano and percussion View From Olympus. Glennie has also released recordings of many of his works.

A highlight of 2000 was the premiere of the saxophone concerto Omnifenix at an outdoor concert before an audience of 8000 people at the 2 Agosto Festival in Bologna, Italy. This work was tailored to the particular improvising talents of tenor saxophonist Michael Brecker.

== Influences ==
His musical style brings together the languages of jazz, classical, Eastern European and Middle Eastern, avant-garde, rock, and electronica.

A retrospective concert of Psathas' chamber music was given in the 2000 New Zealand International Festival of the Arts, culminating with the premiere of the specially commissioned Piano Quintet. In the programme to the concert, he described the process of creating his music:

"When I write music, it's not a sense of inventing I experience, as much as it is a sense of finding something that exists at the remote periphery of what I know. It is like seeing things – that aren't really there – in the corner of one's eye, but not spinning around to view them, because then they would simply cease to be. It is a case of being aware of a thing in one's peripheral vision and, while staring straight ahead, trying to decipher, without looking at it, the true nature of what it is. What one is finding is exactly the right thing for any given moment in a musical work."

== Career highlights ==
In 2000 his percussion works for the Rhythm Spike release gained him the Tui Award for Best Classical Recording at the New Zealand Music Awards. The double concerto View From Olympus for piano, percussion and orchestra was premiered at the Commonwealth Games in Manchester, performed by Evelyn Glennie, Philip Smith and the Halle Orchestra conducted by Mark Elder. This work was awarded the 2002 SOUNZ Contemporary Award, New Zealand's major annual composition award. In 2003 a new CD of chamber works, Fragments, was released to critical acclaim and went on to win another Tui Award for Best Classical Album in 2004. He was named in 2003 as the recipient of one of five Arts Foundation of New Zealand Artist Laureate Awards, which carry cash prizes of $40,000.

In 2004 Psathas achieved the largest audience for New Zealand-composed music when billions heard his fanfares and other music at the opening and closing ceremonies of the Athens Olympics. This high-profile work was recognised in New Zealand's 2005 New Year Honours by his appointment as an Officer of the New Zealand Order of Merit (ONZM). Additionally, his Three Psalms piano concerto, premiered by the New Zealand Symphony Orchestra and soloist Stephen Gosling, was awarded the 2004 SOUNZ Contemporary Award for excellence in composition. Psathas won his third Best Classical Album award in the 2007 New Zealand Music Awards, for View from Olympus.

In 2014 Psathas was awarded a Higher Doctorate of Music by Victoria University of Wellington for his substantial contribution to New Zealand music, and embarked on an ambitious international project as part of New Zealand's WW100 programme to mark the centenary of World War I. The result of this two-year collaboration with film makers and 150 musicians from all over the world was No Mans Land, a multimedia work including film, live performance and pre-recorded musical score. It premiered at the 2016 New Zealand Festival of the Arts before being taken on an international tour. The work examines the journey and ultimate triumph of the human spirit, juxtaposed against and overcoming the futility and terrors of war.

In 2018 Psathas retired from his long university tenure to become a full-time freelance composer, and was granted the position of Emeritus Professor at the New Zealand School of Music. In 2020 he began a three-year Composer-in-Residence partnership with Orchestra Wellington.

== Awards ==
- 2000 New Zealand Music Awards, Best Classical Album: Rhythm Spike
- 2002 SOUNZ Contemporary Award: View From Olympus
- 2003 Arts Foundation of New Zealand Laureate Award
- 2004 SOUNZ Contemporary Award: Three Psalms piano concerto
- 2004 New Zealand Music Awards, Best Classical Album: Psathas: Fragments
- 2005 New Year Honours: Officer of the New Zealand Order of Merit (ONZM) for services to music
- 2007 New Zealand Music Awards, Best Classical Album: View From Olympus
- 2014: Higher Doctorate of Music (DMus), Victoria University of Wellington
- 2021: Absolutely Positively Wellingtonian Award

== Works of music ==
Notable works by John Psathas:

- Waiting for the Aeroplane for piano (1988)
- Matre's Dance for piano and percussion (1991)
- Percussion Concerto for four percussionists and orchestra (1992/95)
- Drum Dances for piano and drum kit (1993)
- Rhythm Spike for piano (1994)
- Three Island Songs for clarinet, cello and piano (1995)
- Abhisheka for string quartet (1996)
- Happy Tachyons for piano and percussion (1996)
- Three Island Songs (version for piano trio) (1996)
- Motet for piano duet (1997)
- Jettatura for piano (1999)
- Luminous for orchestra (1999)
- Saxon for Brass Band (1999) – Written for the 2000 Shell NZ National Brass Band Championships
- Piano Quintet for piano and string quartet (2000)
- Omnifenix concerto for tenor saxophone, drum kit and orchestra (2000)
- Fragment for piano and vibraphone (or piano duet) (2001)
- Orpheus in Rarohenga for soprano, tenor and bass soloists, choir and orchestra (2002)
- View from Olympus: Double Concerto for percussion, piano and orchestra (2002)
- Piano Concerto for piano and orchestra (2003)
- Pieces for the Olympic Games opening and closing ceremonies – Athens 2004 (2004)
- One Study One Summary for marimba, junk percussion and tape (2005)
- A Cool Wind for string quartet (2008) Commissioned by Chamber Music New Zealand and written specifically for the Takács Quartet.
- Elect the Dead Symphony (with Serj Tankian) (Orchestral Arrangements) (2010)
- Kyoto for percussion quintet (2011) Commissioned by Ju Percussion Group for the Taipei International Percussion Convention.
- The New Zeibekiko (2011)
- Planet Damnation for timpani and orchestra (2012)
- No Mans Land (2016)
- Leviathan for percussion and orchestra (2021)
