= Charles Nalden =

New Zealand music academic

Charles Nalden CBE
- Born: John Leslie Simpson; 16 March 1908; London, England
- Died: 17 June 2002 (aged 94) Auckland, New Zealand
- Occupations: bandmaster; conductor; professor of music; author; harpist
- Instruments: Cornet; Harp

Charles Nalden CBE (born John Leslie Simpson; 16 March 1908 – 17 June 2002) was a British and New Zealand musician and professor at the University of Auckland.

Born out of wedlock, at the age of 29 days Nalden was accepted into the Thomas Coram Foundation for Children where his birth name was changed. As 'child number 23,062', Nalden joined the hospital Boys' Band in 1920 at age twelve, where he learned to play Cornet. From the age of 14, Nalden was in His Majesty’s Royal Artillery (Mounted) Band, where he rose to become Bandmaster. During these 26 years of army service, Nalden also studied at the Royal Military School of Music, where he gained a Doctorate in Music.

== Career ==
Three months before his 40th birthday, Nalden arrived in Auckland, New Zealand to join the academic staff of the then Auckland University College, later the University of Auckland, where from 1956, he rose to the rank of Professor and Head of Music, eventually establishing the country’s first conservatorium of music. He remained there until his retirement in 1974, and was conferred with the title of professor emeritus. From 1951 to 1975, Nalden was the conductor of Auckland Junior Symphony Orchestra, several of whose former members formed the Auckland Symphony Orchestra at its 30th anniversary. AJSO was then renamed 'Auckland Youth Orchestra'. Nalden was also a keen harpist, and an EP recording was made of him performing four Celtic pieces for Harp.

== Academic mentorship ==
During his tenure at the University of Auckland from 1948 to 1974, Nalden provided a formative impact on a generation of young classical musicians, composers, performers, and musicologists. Following his appointment as Head of Music in 1956, he used his administrative leadership to expand the department, making pivotal faculty appointments such as the hiring of choral pioneer Peter Godfrey in 1958, pianist Janetta McStay in 1963, baritone Philip Todd in 1967 and composer and organist Douglas Mews in 1969. Nalden’s son, David was appointed to teach violin in 1973, following the departure of Ladislav Jasek.

Nalden’s university and orchestral students include:

- William Dart attended the university as an undergraduate student under Nalden's direct instruction during the early 1970s, later becoming a New Zealand music critic, editor, and broadcaster.
- David Griffiths trained in composition and core musical theory within the department during the early 1970s while Nalden served as professor.
- David Hamilton completed his foundational undergraduate music coursework during the final years of Nalden's departmental headship, subsequently undertaking advanced composition studies under Douglas Mews and John Rimmer.
- Ivan Hunter, trumpet player who studied composition and conducting with Douglas Mews and Nalden. After his studies he was appointed principal trumpet of the Symphonia of Auckland, followed by a free-lance playing career in New Zealand, Australia, Europe and USA.
- Barry Margan was mentored and conducted by Nalden as a young piano soloist with the Junior Symphony Orchestra, later performing widely for Chamber Music New Zealand and the New Zealand Broadcasting Corporation.
- John Rimmer received free horn lessons from Nalden and played under his direction in the Auckland Junior Symphony Orchestra before completing his tertiary music studies and returning as a senior composition faculty member under Nalden's, and subsequently Peter Godfrey's leadership.
- Derek Williams completed his Bachelor of Music degree, graduating 1974 after undertaking early tertiary musical studies under the joint supervision of Nalden, Douglas Mews, and Peter Godfrey. Nalden also hired Williams as a music lecturer while he was still a student.

== Publications ==
- A history of the Conservatorium of Music, University of Auckland, 1888-1981
- Half and half : the memoirs of a charity brat, 1908-1989 (Autobiography)
- Fugal Answer

== Recordings ==
- D SERIES - Dr Nalden, Talk on Junior Symphony Orchestra.
- Awake the Harp

== Honours ==
In the 1976 Birthday Honours, Nalden was appointed a Commander of the Order of the British Empire, for services to music.
