= David Griffiths (composer) =

New Zealand composer, singer (born 1950)

- Origin: Auckland, New Zealand
- Genres: Classical
- Occupations: Composer; Opera/Recital Singer
- Years active: 1973 – present
- Labels: Naxos; Atoll Records; Ode
- Spouse: Christine Griffiths (née Sly)

David Griffiths (born 1950, Auckland, New Zealand) is a composer, baritone and former Senior Lecturer and Convenor of Music at the Conservatorium of Music at the University of Waikato. Griffiths has gained national and international recognition as a composer, opera singer and recital soloist. His choral compositions are popular in the United States of America and have been recorded by several choirs, while many works have been included on various record labels including Naxos Records, Kiwi Pacific and Atoll.

Griffiths has performed as a soloist with the New Zealand Symphony Orchestra, Auckland Philharmonia Orchestra, all major choral societies in New Zealand and regularly with NBR New Zealand Opera. He has also performed as a recital soloist, representing New Zealand in Taiwan, the US, the United Kingdom and Europe.

Griffiths works as a freelance composer and is represented by SOUNZ Aotearoa, the Centre for New Zealand Music. He has held positions of Lecturer and Senior Lecturer in Voice at universities throughout New Zealand and as such has trained singers who have gone on to perform with the Cologne Opera and the Bayreuth Chorus.

== Biography ==
David Griffiths was born 1950 in Auckland, and completed his schooling at Westlake Boys High School while studying piano with Mary Nathan. He graduated in 1971 with a Bachelor of Music from the University of Auckland, where he was taught by Douglas Mews. He studied composition at the Guildhall School of Music in London in 1972. His composition Dormi Jesu was performed by the University of Auckland Festival Choir, which sang at the third International University Choral Festival in New York in May 1972. Griffiths later joined the choir after its return from Europe, when it was renamed 'Auckland University Singers'. He was awarded a Master of Music degree (1st class honours) in composition in 1973. Since that time he has worked as a freelance composer, operatic and recital singer and lecturer in voice, based primarily in Auckland.

In 1974 Griffiths married Christine Sly, a student of Janetta McStay and co-alumnus of Auckland University. A new work Diversions for Two Pianos, a set of 5 pieces in honour of the marriage was composed by Jonathan Ladd.

After the completion of his MMus, Griffiths returned to the UK and Europe, where he was a member of various ensembles including the BBC Singers. On his return to New Zealand, Griffiths won both of New Zealand's premier operatic competitions, the NZ Herald Aria (currently the New Zealand Aria) and the 1983 Mobil Song Quest (now the Kiri Te Kanawa Song Quest). He has held appointments as Lecturer of Voice and Senior Lecturer at the University of Auckland through much of his career except from 1986 until 1992 where he held the same at the University of Otago He was Convenor of Music at the Conservatorium of Music at the University of Waikato, Hamilton and Senior Lecturer of Voice until his retirement in 2016.

== Activities ==
=== Composing ===
Griffiths is recognised as one of New Zealand's leading composers and is represented by SOUNZ Aotearoa, the Centre for New Zealand Music. SOUNZ has on record eighty-six published works by Griffiths including choral music, song cycles, songs, opera, piano music and chamber music for a variety of instruments. He has written commissions for numerous musicians and groups including the Karlheinz Company and the New Zealand Chamber Soloists and has received official support for compositional projects through Creative New Zealand.

Griffiths is well known as a choral composer, with his works being performed by choirs around the world, including several recordings in the United States of America. "Te Deum Laudamus" was commissioned by award-winning, Seattle based vocal ensemble, Opus 7 for their 10th anniversary celebrations in 2002. Other notable works include, "The Servant", for choir, soloist and two string quartets and operas, "The Woman from Moab", based on the biblical book of Ruth and "The White Lady".

Griffiths frequently draws on existing texts for his songs. Many of these have been of an original New Zealand setting, such as "Six Watercolours". This work, originally commissioned by John Rimmer, consists of six art songs with poetry inspired by the paintings of Doris Lusk. They describe some of the untouched landscapes along the New Zealand coast. Other texts are drawn from original traditional Latin liturgical texts and a variety of sources as exhibited in the collected CD of his early art songs, "Charms and Knots".

=== Performing ===
Griffiths has performed frequently with New Zealand Opera, all major choral societies in New Zealand, the Auckland Philharmonia Orchestra and the New Zealand Symphony Orchestra. He performs an extensive baritone repertoire of opera and oratorio and recital tours have taken him to the United Kingdom, Europe the US and Taiwan.

His operatic repertoire has included La Traviata, Madama Butterfly, The Magic Flute, Tosca, Gianni Schicchi, Salome, Der Rosenkavalier, Don Pasquale, The Pearl Fishers, Macbeth, Cenerentola, Die Fledermaus, Julius Caesar, Così fan tutte, Zaida and Galileo. As a concert soloist, Griffiths has performed all the major works of J S Bach, the War Requiem by Benjamin Britten, Elgar's The Dream of Gerontius, Elijah by Felix Mendelssohn, The Light in the Wilderness by Dave Brubeck, Monteverdi's Solemn Vespers, Vaughan Williams' Five Mystical Songs, The Messiah by Handel and Carmina Burana by Carl Orff.

Griffiths has also premiered numerous New Zealand works such as Orpheus in Rarohenga by John Psathas with the NZSO and performed with well-known New Zealand singers such as Sir Donald McIntyre, Malvina Major, Anna Leese and Helen Medlyn.

=== Recording ===
Griffiths has recorded much of the English, German and French Art Song repertoire for Concert FM as well as a significant body of New Zealand music. CD recordings as a soloist have included works such as Prodigal Country with the New Zealand Symphony Orchestra under the direction of the late Sir Charles Groves and the Five Mystical Songs under Karen Grylls, director of the Dorian Choir and songs by with David Farquhar.

Ahi a CD collaboration between the Ogen Trio and the New Zealand Chamber Soloists featured works by Griffiths and four other leading New Zealand composers, Michael Williams, Gareth Farr, Martin Lodge and John Psathas. Griffiths has recorded CDs and DVDs for Naxos Records including "Missa Solemnis, Te Deum" with the New Zealand Symphony Orchestra and Tower Voices NZ Naxos Records as well as Kiwi Pacific Records, Herald Record Label and Ode Records.

=== Teaching ===
Griffiths has held positions of Lecturer of Voice and Senior Lecturer of Voice at the University of Auckland, University of Otago and University of Waikato. He was Senior Lecturer and Convenor of Music at the Conservatorium of Music, University of Waikato until his retirement in 2016.

== Selected works ==
A more complete list of works can be found at SOUNZ Centre for New Zealand Music.

- Beata Virgo for 12 part (SSSAAATTTBBB) choir
- Cosmic Praise for SATB choir and SATB soloists
- Dormi Jesu for SATB choir
- Five Landscapes for SATB choir
- Five Love Songs for tenor and piano
- Four Tudor Anthems for SATB choir
- Lie Deep, My Love a cycle of three settings of poems by James K. Baxter for SATB choir and soloists
- Salve Regina for double SATB choir
- Six Legs or More for piano
- Sonata for horn and piano
- Sonata in C for piano
- St Barnabas Liturgy Parish Communion setting
- Stabat Mater for SATB choir and organ
- Sun Shower and other pieces for piano
- Three Canons for piano
- Three Franks Opera
- The White Lady Opera
- Mary Muller – The Secret Suffragette Opera
- Walls of Troy Opera
