= Karlheinz Company =

New Zealand music ensemble

The Karlheinz Company (established 1978) is a music ensemble based at the University of Auckland School of Music. The ensemble was founded by composer John Rimmer and the first programme included works by Berio, Stockhausen and Rimmer. A programming philosophy developed of combining new New Zealand music and music from the Asia-Pacific region with the works of established twentieth-century composers and those considered more adventurous in style. Particular attention is given to the performance of works by young composers and those associated with the school of music including in recent years Uwe Grodd, Elizabeth Holowell and Dean Sky-Lucas.

The ensemble has been behind the creation of various New Zealand compositions. In 1982, they received funding from Creative New Zealand and commissioned, Ritual Auras, from John Elmsly. Elmsly later joined the staff at the University of Auckland in 1984 and took over direction of the company from Rimmer. Other notable compositions commissioned by the company with assistance from Creative New Zealand have included Concerto for Six by David Farquhar, Mobiles III by John Young, Interior by Jack Body and The Structure of Memory by Dorothy Ker.

Six Watercolours by distinguished New Zealand composer and baritone, David Griffiths was also originally written for the ensemble and was later recorded by the Ogen Trio and New Zealand Chamber Soloists along with works by, Gareth Farr, John Psathas and Michael Williams.

The Karlheinz Company concerts usually take place at the Music Theatre or, until it closed, the Maidment Theatre in Auckland. Concerts have also been presented at the Asia-Pacific Festival in Wellington, the University of Waikato School of Music and St Paul's Collegiate. Concert FM have recorded and broadcast the ensemble on numerous occasions.
