= The Juniper Passion =

The Juniper Passion is a 2011 opera by New Zealand composer Michael F. Williams to a libretto by John Davies. The opera is set in 1944 during the World War II Battle of Monte Cassino, an Allied victory, but with a loss of life totalling approximately 105,000 deaths, including many New Zealand soldiers, over the series of battles. The Juniper Passion is written in three acts, six principal roles and chorus and is scored for chamber orchestra with digital effects. Performance is through dance with only minimal movement and interaction by the singing cast. In place of traditional sets, the opera has a 3-D computer graphic set design by Sean Castle that recreates the Benedictine abbey at Cassino. This is interspersed with images taken during the battle by Richard Ferguson Davies, father of librettist John Davies.

== Premiere ==
The first performance of The Juniper Passion was in April 2012 in Hamilton, New Zealand. Choreography for the event was by Moss Paterson who is the director of Atamira Dance and John Davies, the curriculum leader of live performance at the Unitec Institute of Technology Department of Performing and Screen Arts.

== Recording ==
The Juniper Passion was recorded and produced in 2011 by Wayne Laird of the New Zealand label, Atoll Records. It made use of the Auckland Town Hall organs, digital effects created by the composer and a full cast of singers including New Zealand baritone David Griffiths and leading musicians including the New Zealand Chamber Soloists. Recording took place in both Auckland and Hamilton.

=== Characters ===
- Narrator
- Carlo, a Benedictine monk
- Joe, a New Zealand soldier
- Bruno, a German army officer
- Maria, Carlo's sister
- Helen, Joe and Jessie's daughter
- Jessie, Joe's wife
- Chorus

=== Scoring ===
The work is scored for string quartet, bass, flute, clarinet, trumpet, trombone, piano, percussion, organ, sound effects.
