= New Zealand gamelan =

Gamelan music in New Zealand

Gamelan orchestral instruments were introduced to New Zealand from Java in 1974. There are several gamelan ensembles in New Zealand and gamelan has influenced many New Zealand composers such as Jack Body and Gareth Farr.

== History ==
In May 1974 the Indonesian Embassy in Wellington presented the NZBC Orchestra (now the New Zealand Symphony Orchestra) with a set of gongs. They were first played in November of that year after the composer Jack Body, who had spent time in Indonesia in the early 1970s, wrote a piece Resonance Music for guitar and six percussionists.

Also in 1974 Allan Thomas, who became a lecturer in music at Victoria University of Wellington, returned to New Zealand bringing an antique gamelan orchestra with him. He had studied gamelan at the Tropen Museum in Amsterdam and lived in Cirebon, in north-west Java. In December 1974 Thomas and Body were among a group of performers who played Thomas's gamelan in Auckland at one of the first performances in New Zealand. Another early performance of gamelan was at the 1976 South Pacific Festival of Arts in Rotorua.

In 1999 Thomas and Body organised the BEAT! Festival in Wellington to mark the 25th anniversary of gamelan in New Zealand. Festival participants came from New Zealand, Australia, Singapore, West Java, Central Java, Bali, Sumatra, the Netherlands and the USA.

In 2002 I Wayan Gde Yudane, a Balinese musician and composer, was appointed as the 2002 Artist-in-Residence at Victoria University's School of Music. He composed for the university's Gamelan Padhang Moncar (Javanese style gamelan orchestra) and has collaborated with several composers including Australian composer Paul Grabowsky on a piece called The Theft of Sita (2000) and Jack Body. Body became manager of the Gamelan Padhang Moncar and organised tours in New Zealand and to Indonesia as well as promoting gamelan in New Zealand and in music education.

As at 2021 Victoria has two gamelan: the Gamelan Padhang Moncar and the Gamelan Taniwha Jaya. The latter is a Balinese Gong Kebyar which was purchased by Gareth Farr in 2003.

Other gamelan orchestras were set up in Auckland, Dunedin and Christchurch by the late 1990s. By 2008 there were Central Javanese gamelan at the University of Otago, Victoria University and in Auckland, gamelan gong kebyar at the University of Canterbury and Massey University and Cirebon gamelan at Victoria; there were gamelan tutors at four universities: Otago, Canterbury, Massey and Auckland.

In Auckland a full Javanese gamelan orchestra was gifted to the Auckland University of Technology by the Indonesia Ministry of Education and Culture in 2017. Gamelan was introduced to the University of Otago in 1995 by Professor Henry Johnson and the first set of bronze instruments from Central Java arrived in 1996. In Christchurch a Balinese Gong Kebyar was established at the University of Canterbury in 1995 by Elaine Dobson, who composed for the group. It was still active in 2019.

== Influence on New Zealand composers ==
Gamelan has inspired a number of New Zealand composers who have either written for gamelan or incorporated gamelan into their music. Gareth Farr has used gamelan instruments or composed for non-gamelan instruments to be played in a gamelan-like way in compositions such as Siteran (1990) for Javanese gamelan and harp, Kebyar Moncar (1993) for Victoria's gamelan, Tabuh Pacific (1995) for Balinese gamelan and orchestra, From the Depths Sound the Great Sea Gongs (1996) for orchestra and the piano piece Sepuluh Jari (1996). Anthony Ritchie, while not a gamelan player, used gamelan scales in his symphony Boum (1993) and in his piano piece 24 Preludes (2002). His attraction to gamelan is from the sounds it makes. Helen Bowater played in the Gamelan Padhang Moncar at Victoria and her composition Tembang Matjapat (1999) is scored for gamelan and western strings and percussion instruments.

Jack Body composed numerous works for gamelan and piano, gamelan and orchestra, gamelan and organ, gamelan and choral plainsong. After Bach for massed violas and gamelan was commissioned for the 2001 International Viola Congress held in Wellington.

Wayan Yudane has collaborated with both Body and Farr. Yudane and Farr's Spinning Mountain (2007) is a Balinese inspired story for children and their families using instruments from the gamelan gong kebyar and Western instruments. Yudane and Body composed Paradise Regained (1984) for premade (Balinese metallophone) and piano for Indonesian pianist Ananda Sukarlan.

Other composers influenced by gamelan are Nigel Keay, John Rimmer, Miranda Adams, Elaine Dobson and James Instone.

== See also ==
- Gamelan outside Indonesia
