= Atoll Records =

New Zealand record label

- Parent company: Atoll Records Ltd
- Founded: 1997; 28 years ago
- Founder: Wayne Laird
- Distributor(s): Wyastone Estate
- Genre: Classical
- Country of origin: New Zealand
- Location: Auckland
- Official website: www.atoll.co.nz

Atoll Records is a New Zealand record label dedicated to classical, historical and contemporary music.

== About ==
Atoll Records was established by composer and producer Wayne Laird in 1997. Based in Auckland, the label records primarily in Auckland, Hamilton and Wellington with additional recordings being made in the UK and Ireland. The catalogue of approximately one hundred CDs features contemporary solo musicians such as Michael Houstoun, Santiago Canon-Valencia and historical musicians such as Richard Farrell and Oscar Natska. Ensembles, the New Zealand Symphony Orchestra, Auckland Philharmonia Orchestra, New Zealand Chamber Soloists and New Zealand String Quartet all feature strongly within the label as do New Zealand's leading composers, Gillian Whitehead, Jack Body, Michael F. Williams (composer), Gareth Farr and John Psathas. Atoll CDs are available in New Zealand, the UK, North America, across Europe and in parts of Asia.

In 2014 Atoll Records entered into an exclusive worldwide manufacturing and distribution agreement with Wyastone Estate, home of Nimbus Records.

== Atoll artists ==
=== Selected composers ===
- Christopher Blake
- Eve de Castro-Robinson
- David Griffiths
- Philip Dadson
- Anthony Ritchie
- Gillian Whitehead
- Janet Jennings

=== Selected ensembles ===
- Auckland Philharmonia Orchestra
- Flight
- New Zealand Chamber Soloists
- New Zealand String Quartet
- New Zealand Symphony Orchestra

=== Awards ===
- "Angel at Ahipara" by composer Christopher Blake with the New Zealand Symphony Orchestra Strings - Winner in the Best Classical Album 2012 New Zealand Music Awards
- "A bugle will do" by composer Anthony Ritchie with the New Zealand Symphony Orchestra - Finalist in the Best Classical Album 2012 New Zealand Music Awards
- "Releasing the Angel" by composer, Eve de Castro-Robinson - Finalist in Best Classical Album 2012 New Zealand Music Awards
- "Requiem" by composer, Boris Pigovat- Supersonic Award from Pizzicato, Luxembourg.
- "Notes from a Journey" by The New Zealand String Quartet - Winner in Best Classical Album 2011 New Zealand Music Awards
- "Flight" by Flight (Carolyn Mills & Bridget Douglas) - Nominee in Best Classical 2011 New Zealand Music Awards
- "Gung-Ho: Virtuoso Works for Trombone" by David Bremner - Winner in Best Classical Album 2009 New Zealand Music Awards
- "Ahi" by The Ogen Trio with members of the New Zealand Chamber Soloists - Nominee in Best Classical Album 2009 New Zealand Music Awards
- "Puhake ki te rangi" by Dame Gillian Whitehead - Nominee in Best Classical Album 2008 New Zealand Music Awards
