= John Rimmer =

John Rimmer may refer to:

- John Rimmer (athlete) (1878–1962), British athlete and Olympian
- John Rimmer (composer) (born 1939), New Zealand composer
