= Douga =

Ceremonial dance of the West African Mandinka people

And when my father, after having soldered the large grain of gold that crowned the summit, held out his work to be admired, the griot would no longer be able to contain himself. He would begin to intone the douga, the great chant which is sung only for celebrated men and which is danced by them alone.

— Camara Laye, The African Child

The douga or the "dance of the vultures" is a ceremonial dance (and song) among the Mandinka people of West Africa.

According to religious scholar Ada Uzoamaka Azodo, its relevance operates on three levels: it is "performed only occasionally at great events, [and] marks the religious revival of this Guinean community; "it shows the dominion of human knowledge, creative skills, and wisdom over matter and bestial instinct", and it "demonstrates ... the promise of resurrection of the dead to life". According to Christopher Miller, it reflects "the hierarchical, casted order of traditional Mande society" (of which the Mandinka are a part) and in essence forms a chain going back to the emperor Sundiata Keita.

There is, however, some doubt about to which extent the douga "belongs" to the Mandinka or the Mandé people more generally. Uzo Esonwanne casts doubt on Frantz Fanon's claim that Fodéba Keïta's African Dawn assigns a kind of ownership to the Mandé, or Christopher Miller's assumption that it belonged to a Mandé elite.

== In art and literature ==
Notable works of literature in which the douga is danced include Fodéba Keïta's African Dawn and Camara Laye's The African Child. In the latter, the narrator's father, a blacksmith who sometimes works with gold, dances the douga after making a piece of gold jewelry for a customer. Literary critic Jacques Bourgeac says that the blacksmith's smelting of gold nuggets and the creation of the piece of jewelry is a symbolic repetition of the birth of the Mandinka and asserts their power. The griot, who had mediated between the customer and the blacksmith, also mediates between the blacksmith and the gods in his singing of the douga.

The douga was recorded by Mory and Madina Kouyaté, Guinean griots, in 1960, and that recording was reworked in the 1960s by the Ensemble National de Guinée "as a praise song to the Guinean army". That version, "Armée Guinnéenne", was in turn adapted by the Guinean jazz ensemble Bembeya Jazz National, in what is said to be an updated version of the douga, "an ancient Malinké [or Mandinka] warrior song".

The song is linked to the ring shouts of the Gullah people of the US Atlantic coast, and specifically the buck dance the "Buzzard lope" (a well-known element of African-American dancing of the 19th century, and later incorporated into the minstrel show) is said to be "resonant" with the douga.
