= Douglas Mews (composer) =

Canadian composer and musician (1918–1993)

Douglas Kelson Mews (22 September 1918 – 3 August 1993) was a Canadian-born composer, organist and church musician who worked in England and New Zealand. He taught composition at the University of Auckland from 1969 to 1983. Mews was a church organist and Director of Music at Auckland's Catholic cathedral from 1970 to 1982. He composed a significant body of music for the liturgy as well as choral works, operas, piano and instrumental pieces and works for the accordion, much of it composed after he emigrated to New Zealand in 1969.

== Early life and education ==
Mews was born on 22 September 1918 in St John's, Newfoundland, Canada and baptised Erik Douglas Kelson Mews. His father Arthur was an organist in the Methodist church and his mother Florence was a pianist and piano teacher. In 1936 the family moved to London where he studied music at Trinity College from 1936 to 1939 gaining an FRCO in 1938 and a BMus in 1939 and winning the Lafontaine prize in organ performance in 1938. He was called up in 1939 to the British Army, serving in Europe and North Africa in World War II until 1946. In June 1945 he gave the first organ recital after liberation in Zeist, Netherlands.

== Career ==
After the war Mews became a professor and examiner for Trinity College from 1946 to 1963. He graduated with a DMus in 1961. From 1963 to 1968 he lectured at the North-East Essex Technical College (later the Colchester Institute) before emigrating to New Zealand in 1969 where he lectured in composition at the University of Auckland. He was appointed an associate professor in 1974.

Apart from his university teaching Mews did radio broadcasting in the UK, Germany, Netherlands, Canada and New Zealand playing the organ and presenting a 'composer of the week' talk on the NZBC. He held church music positions as organist of St George's Cathedral in Southwark, London and the Director of Music at St Patrick's Cathedral in Auckland from 1970 to 1982. He was particularly skillful at improvisation on the organ and piano.

In the 1960s the Second Vatican Council permitted the use of English, rather than Latin, in the Catholic liturgy. This gave Mews the opportunity to write many English language compositions for the liturgy, both for the choir and congregation. In 1990 he received a Papal Knighthood of the Order of Sylvester from the Catholic Church for his service on the Music Subcommittee of ICEL (International Commission for English in the Liturgy).

Mews composed a variety of works: choral works, opera, piano and instrumental pieces and accordion works; His composing flourished after he arrived in New Zealand. He was often inspired by poetry and other texts. He set two poems by British poet James Kirkup to music: Japan Physical (1976) for soprano and piano and Ghosts, Fire, Water (1972) for unaccompanied choir and alto solo. Ghosts, Fire, Water was from Kirkup's anthology No more Hiroshimas: poems and translations and was based on three of the Hiroshima Panels. One of Mews's sons had recited the poem at his school prize-giving prompting Mews to set it to music played by the sopranino and bass recorder and drum. He then wrote a choral setting for the University of Auckland Festival Choir which performed it at the International University Choral Festival in New York and at other concerts on its world tour in 1972, including to Benjamin Britten and Peter Pears at The Maltings in Snape, Aldeburgh.

"Kirkup’s poem ends: “Forgive us that we had to see your passion to remember / What we must never again deny: Love one another.” He decided to have this phrase spoken against the plainchant hymn, Ubi caritas et amor, Deus ibi est (Where charity and love are, there God abides). Different singers then spoke aloud Love one another in the languages of the choirs attending the Festival: Poland, West Germany, Hungary, Czechoslovakia, Denmark, the Netherlands, France, Great Britain, Uganda, Argentina, Brazil, the US, Japan, Korea, India, and New Zealand (in Māori)."

Audiences were affected by the poignancy and emotional power of the work; in Maastricht the audience gave the choir a standing ovation. It has continued to be part of the choral repertoire and was sung by the New Zealand Youth Choir on its 1988 tour to Europe and Britain.

Other influences on his compositions were Tongan and Māori chants in his liturgical music and in other choral works. He arranged three Māori songs for the Festival Choir's tour and composed The Love Song of Rangipouri, which incorporated a traditional Māori chant, for Auckland's Dorian Choir. The choir performed it and The May Magnificat on their overseas tours in the 1970s. Inspired by biblical texts and themes he wrote three operas, The Kiss, The Waiting Father and Lazarus, and the oratorio The Cloud on the Mountain about the desert father St Anthony.

Commissioned by the New Zealand Accordion Association Mews composed the solo accordion piece Suite Aotea as a test piece for the 1980 Coupe Mondiale World Championships which were held in New Zealand. The Accordion Teachers Guild USA then commissioned him to write a piece for the 1981 Coupe Mondiale; he composed Table Talk for accordion ensemble and choir. Other solo pieces were Neat Fingers, Putorino Dance, Harbour Lights and Pupuke-Moana. In 1974 he became an examiner and board member of the Accordion Examination Board of New Zealand (AEBNZ). He received the AEBNZ Certificate of Merit in 1992 for developing a formal syllabus and examination standards for accordion.

== Academic mentorship ==
During his tenure at the University of Auckland from 1969 to 1983, Mews mentored a generation of New Zealand composers, performers, and musicologists:

- David Griffiths trained in composition under Mews at Auckland University during the early 1970s, later becoming a composer, baritone, and Senior Lecturer at the University of Waikato.
- David Hamilton attended Auckland University from 1974 to 1979, where his principal composition teachers were Mews and John Rimmer, earning a Master of Music with first-class honours.
- Geoffrey Hinds completed an MPhil at Auckland in 1975, majoring in composition directly under Mews's supervision.
- Dorothy Ker completed both her Bachelor of Music and Master of Music degrees at the University of Auckland, where she studied composition under the tutelage of Mews and John Rimmer.
- Don McGlashan studied music at the University of Auckland during Mews's tenure, noting him alongside Rimmer as one of his formative composition lecturers before transitioning into contemporary alternative songwriting.
- Peter Watts MNZM, later the long-time Musical Director of Auckland Choral, was among the performers and conductors who completed their musical training under Mews at the university.
- Derek Williams studied composition under Mews, graduating from Auckland with a BMus in 1974. He worked internationally as a composer, conductor and arranger before earning a PhD in composition from the University of Edinburgh, where he has taught part time since 2007.

== Legacy ==
In 1983 to mark his retirement Mews established the Douglas Mews Composition Prize at the University of Auckland. The prize is awarded to a student who writes the best composition of a setting for an unaccompanied choir.

== Personal life ==
Mews met his wife Constantia (Nancy) Radius (1922–1984) just after the war while he was stationed in the Netherlands. He converted to Catholicism and they married in 1947 and had three children: Sandra, Constant, an academic, and Douglas, a musician and organist. In his spare time Mews enjoyed meccano and model railways.

Mews died on 3 August 1993.

== Publications ==
- Mews. D. (1982) Harmony: a young musician's introduction. Auckland, N.Z.: Lone Kauri Press.
- Mews, D. (1989) 'In retrospect : my nineteen years as a mewsician {musician} in New Zealand' Canzona, Sum 1989; v.11 n.31, 4–6.

== Selected works ==
- Ghosts, Fire, Water (1972) - for unaccompanied choir and alto solo
- Joshua (1973) - concerto for trombone and orchestra
- Double string trio (1974)
- The Love Song of Rangipouri (1975) - for unaccompanied choir
- Japan Physical (1976) - for soprano and piano
- Dinosaurs, decapods, donkeys (1976) - for two pianos
- The May Magnificat (1977) - for unaccompanied choir
- Five Melodies of Passion and Dispassion (1979) - for solo cello
- Threnody (1979) - for organ. Written for Westminster Abbey ANZAC Service
- Suite Aotea (1980) - for free bass accordion
- Table Talk (1981) - for choir and accordion quintet
- The Circle of a Girl's Arms (1982) - for choir, harp and wind ensemble
- The Kiss (1985) - opera for Passover
- The Waiting Father (1988) - biblical opera
- Lazarus (1988) - biblical opera
- Concerto for two pianos (1988)
- Gigue de Pan (1988) - for organ and small drums
- The Cloud on the Mountain (1990) - oratorio for tenor, baritone, choir and orchestra

A list of Mews's compositions and recordings can be found on the SOUNZ website.
