= Colin Cole (fashion designer) =

New Zealand fashion designer (1931–1987)

Colin Desmond Cole (1 February 1931 – June 1987) was a New Zealand fashion designer, active from the 1950s to 1980s.

Cole was born in Rotorua in 1931, the son of Howard and Whylma Cole; his mother was a seamstress and pattern maker. He attended Dilworth School in Auckland. After a short lived job in the post office in Rotorua he began his career in fashion as a pattern cutter and apprentice designer for two dress making companies in Auckland, F.M. King and Classic Manufacturing. He then designed children's clothes for manufacturer Poppetware. In 1958 he set up his own business opening a boutique in Karangahape Rd before moving to Queen St and finally Parnell where his boutique was called The Establishment.

Cole designed uniforms for different organisations and groups. In 1967 he designed new uniforms in wool gaberdine for female rail staff and a National Bank uniform in 1970. Uniforms made of wool donated by the Wool Board were designed for the University of Auckland Festival Choir in 1972 for their overseas tour.

Cole exhibited and sold garments outside New Zealand: at the Commonwealth fashion show in 1967, and in Muscat, Oman in 1986. His dresses were also worn by well-known women such as opera singer Kiri Te Kanawa. In 1968 one of his dresses was worn by Christine Antunovic representing New Zealand at the Miss Universe contest. Lady Reeves, wife of Governor General Sir Paul Reeves, wore dresses designed by Cole at her husband's investiture and diplomatic reception in 1985. Garments by Cole were collected by farmer and fashion collector Eden Hore.

Cole was influenced by Christian Dior's work to take up a career in fashion design. He was known for his bespoke evening dresses, ball gowns, debutante gowns, and smart daywear. He specialised in personalised service and interaction with customers. "In 1983, he said his aim as a designer was to bring to New Zealand women the truth about line and designs expressed in international fashion."

== Personal life ==
Cole and his wife Mairehau had eight daughters. One of his daughters, Lissy Robinson-Cole, is also a fashion designer who is known for creating crochet sculpture with her husband Rudi Robinson-Cole.

Cole died in June 1987 in Green Lane Hospital after heart surgery.
