= James Kirkup =

English poet, translator and travel writer (1918–2009)

James Kirkup FRSL
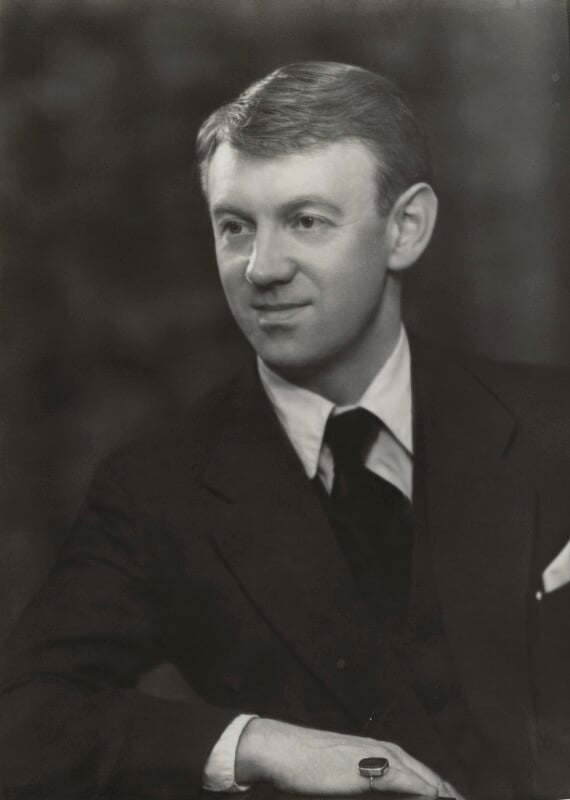
- Kirkup c. 1954
- Born: James Harold Kirkup; 23 April 1918; England
- Died: 10 May 2009 (aged 91); Andorra
- Education: Durham University
- Occupations: Poet, writer, translator
- Writing career
- Pen name: James Falconer; Jun Honda; Andrew James; Taeko Kawai; Felix Liston; Edward Raeburn; Ivy B. Summerforest
- Genres: Poetry, fiction, journalism

James Harold Kirkup FRSL (23 April 1918 – 10 May 2009) was an English poet, translator and travel writer. He wrote more than 45 books, including autobiographies, novels and plays. He wrote under many pen-names including James Falconer, Jun Honda, Andrew James, Taeko Kawai, Felix Liston, Edward Raeburn, and Ivy B. Summerforest. He became a Fellow of the Royal Society of Literature in 1962.

== Early life ==
James Kirkup was brought up in South Shields, England, and was educated at Westoe Secondary School, and then at King's College, Durham University. During the Second World War, he was a conscientious objector, and worked for the Forestry Commission, on the land in the Yorkshire Dales and at the Lansbury Gate Farm, Clavering, Essex. He taught at The Downs School in Colwall, Malvern, where W. H. Auden had earlier been a master. Kirkup wrote his first book of poetry there; this was The Drowned Sailor, which was published in 1947. From 1950 to 1952, he was the first Gregory Poetry Fellow at Leeds University, making him the first resident university poet in the United Kingdom.

He moved south with his partner to Gloucestershire in 1952, and became a visiting poet at Bath Academy of Art for the next three years. Moving on from Bath, Kirkup taught in a London grammar school before leaving England in 1956 to live and work in continental Europe, the Americas and the Far East. In Japan, he found acceptance and appreciation of his work, and he settled there for 30 years, lecturing in English literature at several universities.

== Blasphemy case ==
Kirkup came to public attention in 1977, after the newspaper Gay News published his poem "The Love That Dares to Speak Its Name", in which a Roman centurion describes his lust for and attraction to the crucified Jesus. In the Whitehouse v Lemon case, Mary Whitehouse, then Secretary of the National Viewers' and Listeners' Association, successfully prosecuted the editor of the newspaper, Dennis Lemon, for blasphemous libel under the Blasphemy Act 1697.

== Poetry ==
After the writing of simple verses and rhymes from the age of six, and the publication of The Drowned Sailor in 1947, Kirkup's published works encompassed several dozen collections of poetry, six volumes of autobiography, more than a hundred monographs of original work and translations and thousands of shorter pieces in journals and periodicals. His skilled writing of haiku and tanka is acknowledged internationally. Many of his poems recall his childhood days in the north-east, and are featured in such publications as The Sense of the Visit, To the Ancestral North, Throwback, and Shields Sketches.

In 1995, James Hogg and Wolfgang Görtschacher (University of Salzburg Press / Poetry Salzburg) received a letter from Andorra signed by Kirkup, who had just returned from Japan. Kirkup suggested the republication of some of his early books that had been out of print for quite a while. At the same time he wanted to offer new manuscripts that would establish the Salzburg imprint as his principal publisher. What started in 1995 with the collection Strange Attractors and A Certain State of Mind – the latter an anthology of classic, modern and contemporary Japanese haiku – ended after more than a dozen publications with the epic poem Pikadon in 1997 and Diversions: A Celebration for James Kirkup on His Eightieth Birthday in 1998.

Kirkup's home town of South Shields now holds a growing collection of his works in the Central Library, and artefacts from his time in Japan are housed in the nearby Museum. His last volume of poetry was published during the summer of 2008 by Red Squirrel Press, and was launched at Central Library in South Shields.

== Bibliography ==
=== Poetry ===
- The Drowned Sailor (1947)
- The Submerged Village and Other Poems (1951)
- A Correct Compassion and Other Poems (1952)
- A Spring Journey and Other Poems 1952–1953 (1954)
- The Descent into the Cave and Other Poems (1957)
- The Prodigal Son, Poems 1956–1959 (1959)
- Refusal to Confirm Last and First Poems (1963)
- No Men Are Foreign (1966)
- The Caged Bird in Springtime (1967)
- White Shadows, Black Shadows: Poems of Peace & War (1970)
- The Body Servant: Poems of Exile (1971)
- A Bewick Bestiary (1971; 2009)
- The Sand Artist (1978)
- The Haunted Lift (1982)
- The Lonely Scarecrow (1983)
- To the Ancestral North: Poems for an Autobiography (1983)
- The Sense of the Visit (1984)
- The House at Night (1988)
- Throwback: Poems towards an Autobiography (1988)
- No more Hiroshimas: poems and translations (1995)
- Strange Attractors (University of Salzburg / Poetry Salzburg 1995)
- A Certain State of Mind – An Anthology of Classic, Modern and Contemporary Japanese Haiku in Translation with Essays and Reviews (University of Salzburg / Poetry Salzburg 1995)
- Broad Daylight: Poems East and West (University of Salzburg / Poetry Salzburg 1996)
- The Patient Obituarist (University of Salzburg / Poetry Salzburg 1996)
- How to Cook Women (University of Salzburg / Poetry Salzburg 1996)
- Tanka Tales (University of Salzburg / Poetry Salzburg 1996)
- Collected Shorter Poems: Omens of Disaster (Vol. 1) and Once and for All (Vol. 2) (University of Salzburg / Poetry Salzburg 1996)
- An Extended Breath (University of Salzburg / Poetry Salzburg 1996)
- Burning Giraffes (University of Salzburg / Poetry Salzburg 1996)
- Measures of Time (University of Salzburg / Poetry Salzburg 1996)
- Pikadon: An Epic Poem (University of Salzburg / Poetry Salzburg 1997)
- He Dreamed He was a Butterfly (1997)
- Marsden Bay (2008)
- Home Thoughts (2011)

=== Plays ===
- True Mystery of the Nativity (first published 1956)
- The Prince of Homburg (first published 1959)
- The Physicists (first produced 1963, first published 1963)
- The Meteor (first produced 1966, first published 1973)
- Play Strindberg (first produced 1972)
- ”The Conformer” (first produced 1975)
- Two German Drama Classics (Heinrich von Kleist: The Prince of Homburg; Johann Christoph Friedrich von Schiller: Don Carlos. Transl. James Kirkup. University of Salzburg / Poetry Salzburg, 1996)
- True Misteries and A Chronicle Play of Peterborough Cathedral (1 vol. Transl. James Kirkup. University of Salzburg / Poetry Salzburg, 1996)

=== Autobiography ===
- The Only Child: An Autobiography of Infancy (1957)
- Sorrows, Passions and Alarms: An Autobiography of Childhood (1959)
- What is English Poetry? (1968)
- I, of All People: An Autobiography of Youth (1990)
- A Poet Could Not But be Gay (1991)
- Me All Over (1993)
- A Child of the Tyne (incl. The Only Child: An Autobiography of Infancy and Sorrow, Passions and Alarms: An Autobiography of Childhood; University of Salzburg / Poetry Salzburg 1996)

=== Criticism ===
- Diversions: A Celebration for James Kirkup on His Eightieth Birthday (University of Salzburg / Poetry Salzburg 1998)

=== Description and travel ===
- These horned islands: a journal of Japan (1962)
- Tokyo (1966)
- Filipinescas Travels in the Philippines Today (1968)
- Streets of Asia 585857574(196932312112156)
- Japan behind the Fan (197047)
- Heaven, Hell and Hara-Kiri (1974)

=== Translation ===
- "Michel the Giant - An African in Greenland*, by Tété-Michel Kpomassie. From French to English. (1983)
- Camara Laye - The Dark Child
- Camara Laye - The Radiance of the King
- Camara Laye - A Dream of Africa
- Camara Laye - The Guardian of the Word

Kirkup held the Atlantic Award for Literature from the Rockefeller Foundation in 1950; he was elected a Fellow of the Royal Society of Literature in 1962; he won the Japan P.E.N. Club Prize for Poetry in 1965; and was awarded the Scott Moncrieff Prize for Translation in 1992. In the mid-1990s he won the Japanese Festival Foundation Prize for A Book of Tanka.

He died in Andorra on 10 May 2009, aged 91, but his ashes are buried in Kyoto, Japan.

== Legacy ==
Kirkup's papers are held at Yale and South Shields.

New Zealand composer Douglas Mews set two of Kirkup's poems to music: Japan Physical for soprano and piano and Ghosts, Fire, Water for unaccompanied choir and alto solo. Ghosts, Fire, Water was written for the University of Auckland Festival Choir which performed it at the International Universities' Choral Festival in New York and at other concerts on its world tour in 1972. The poem from Kirkup's anthology No more Hiroshimas: poems and translations was based on three of the Hiroshima Panels. Audiences were affected by the poignancy and emotional power of the work and it has continued to be part of the choral repertoire.
