= Gary Daverne =

New Zealand composer

Gary Daverne ONZM
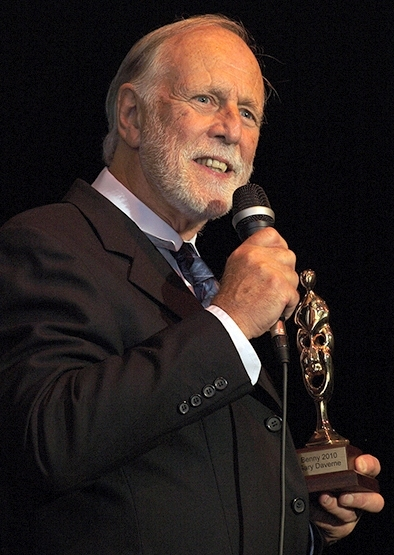
- Daverne at the 2010 Benny Award
- Born: 1939 (age 86–87); Auckland, New Zealand
- Occupations: Musical arranger, composer, conductor, director and producer
- Website: garydaverne.gen.nz

Gary Michiel Daverne ONZM (born 1939) is a New Zealand musical arranger, composer, conductor, director and producer.

He was appointed an Officer of the New Zealand Order of Merit in 1996. He held the position of Music Director/Conductor of the Auckland Symphony Orchestra from its formation in 1975 until 2010 when, on retiring, he was appointed Music Director Emeritus. Daverne has also composed music for symphony orchestras, brass and military bands, children's songs and musicals with more than 500 television and radio advertising jingles, film soundtracks and pop songs. Daverne is New Zealand's most prolific composer and arranger of music for the accordion. As a music producer Daverne has released over forty albums achieving one Platinum and two Gold records.

Since his retirement from the Auckland Symphony directorship position, he has gone back to his pop and rock 'n' roll roots as a record producer, digitally re-mastering, mainly for internet re-release on his Viscount label, archive recordings that he produced in his earlier years, along with producing new recording projects. He is still actively involved as a guest conductor with orchestras and as a musical arranger and composer.

During the 2014/15 period, Gary was musical director for three highly successful children’s musicals at the Glen Eden Playhouse Theatre in Auckland. Two of these musicals: Robyn Hood – Outlaw Princess (words by John Reynolds) and Cats of Ponsonby (words and story by Ray Prowse), Gary had composed the music for some 40 years ago but had recently revised and updated. The third show was The Rockin’ Tale of Snow White.

Other recent compositions by Gary include: Auckland March, Silver Fern March, 2nd Rhapsody for Solo Accordion and Orchestra and Dardanelle, a major work for orchestra and choir commissioned in 2016 by Turkey for their 100-year Gallipoli centenary.

In June 2015 he released his first book, From the Podium, sharing tales from his life of forty years conducting orchestras and choirs around the world. See http://www.garydaverne.gen.nz for details.

== Biography ==
Daverne was born in 1939 in Auckland, New Zealand and was educated at Auckland University and Auckland Teachers Training College. He started his musical career in brass bands as a euphonium player, later changing to clarinet, playing in symphony orchestras, jazz combos and top New Zealand rock bands during the 1960s. He started playing piano seriously at age 21 and became a top line jazz and rock/pop pianist. He also doubled on alto and tenor saxophones.

He moved to London in the late 1960s and studied musical composition and conducting, achieving a Fellowship at Trinity College.

Upon his return to New Zealand Daverne worked for Television New Zealand as a highly regarded music director, arranger and conductor on many top television shows. He founded the Auckland Symphony Orchestra in 1975 and was resident conductor/music director until 2010 when he was appointed Music Director Emeritus.

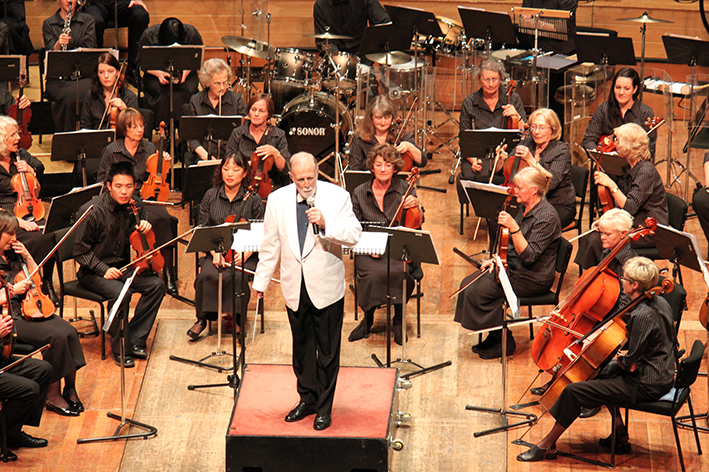
Founder and Musical Director Gary Daverne ONZM with the Auckland Symphony Orchestra

He was appointed music director for the 1975 New Zealand Waitangi Day Celebrations, attended by Her Majesty the Queen of New Zealand and other members of the British royal family. Daverne is notable for being probably the only civilian in recent history to musically direct a Royal occasion, conducting the Royal New Zealand Navy Band, without a commission.

Daverne is a qualified Secondary School teacher in economics, accounting and music and was Head of Department of commerce at Glendowie College. In 1978 he was selected by the New Zealand Education Department as "Composer in Schools", an appointment that he held for two years. During this time he composed many songs and musicals for children which have remained popular and are still regularly performed. Musicals include Cats of Ponsonby, Tales of Panapa, Young Mozart, Tiddalik The Frog, The Brothers Three and Robyn Hood: Outlaw Princess.

In 1997 he was the musical director for the Military Tattoo held in New Plymouth. This event had a total participating cast of over 1500 including the Army, Royal New Zealand Navy and Royal New Zealand Air Force and Artillery Bands, orchestra, 300-voice choir and 160 Pipes and Drums including the Band of The Black Watch Royal Regiment of Scotland.

Daverne has conducted many major orchestras around the world including London's Royal Philharmonic, the Shanghai Symphony, the Taiwan Symphony, Moravian Philharmonic-Czech Republic, the National Symphony Orchestra of Malaysia and the Turkish State Orchestras of Istanbul, Bursa and Adana. In 2002 he became the first New Zealander to be invited to conduct in South Korea.

In 2005 and 2008 he conducted concerts with the Moravian Philharmonic and Czech Republic Orchestras in a programme of his original music and film scores. 2007 saw Daverne conducting the Auckland Symphony Orchestra on a tour of China, playing to large audiences in Beijing, Shanghai and Shi Jia Zhuang. The Shanghai concert was televised during prime time to an estimated audience of 143 million.

Daverne is also well known for his arrangements and compositions for both the solo accordion and accordion orchestras.

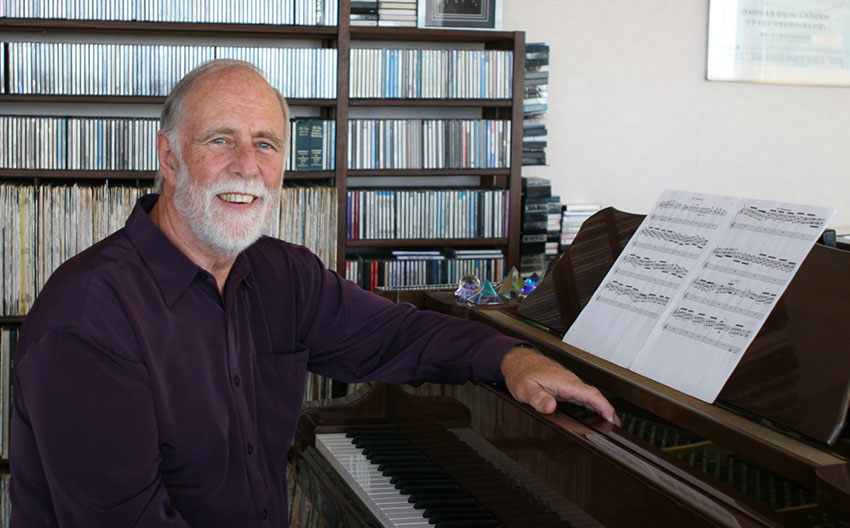
Gary Daverne ONZM at the piano

In the 2009 Coupe Mondiale World Accordion Championships Daverne conducted the world premiere of his commissioned composition Auckland March, performed by the World Accordion Orchestra III, 147 accordions representing 12 nationalities.

In June 2015 he released his first book, From the Podium, sharing tales from his life of forty years conducting orchestras and choirs around the world.

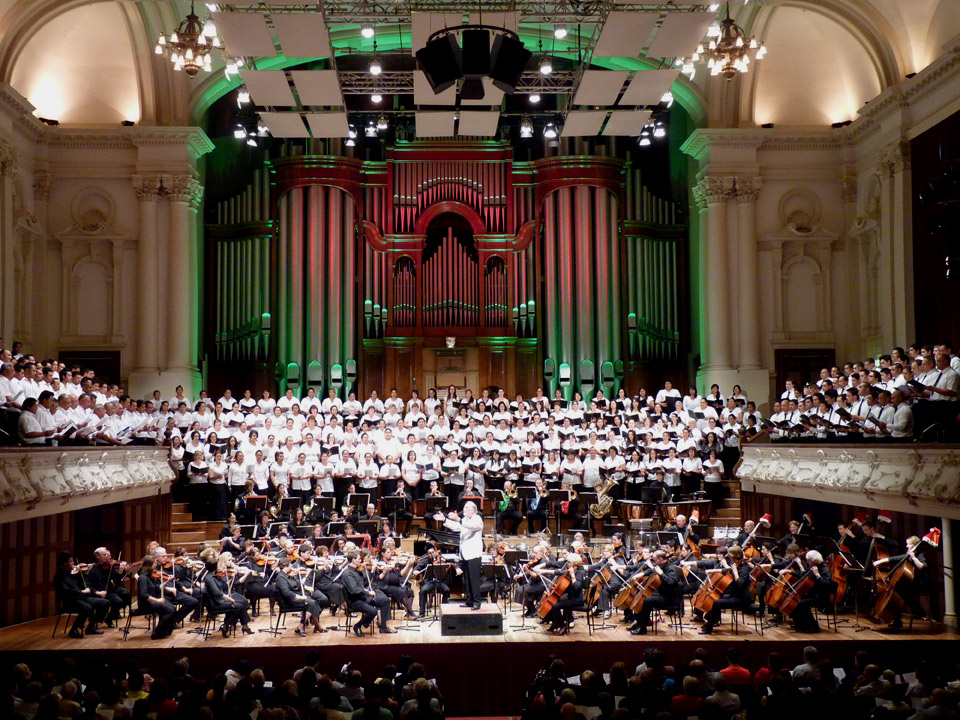
Carol Concert 2010 Auckland Town Hall. Auckland Symphony Orchestra, conductor Gary Daverne, with combined Pacific Island Church choirs

Orchestral compositions include :

- Auckland March
- A Jazz Burlesque (String Orchestra)
- A Pocket Overture
- Concert Waltz for Solo Accordion and Strings
- Fanfare and Procession
- For the Academy – Concert Overture
- Gallipoli – A Rhapsody for Trumpet and Orchestra
- Gem of the Kaipara – for Solo Accordion with Strings and Percussion
- Ghosts of Alberton
- Highbury Grove, Concert Overture
- Ka Puke Maeroero, Symphonic Tone Poem
- Portrait of Ponsonby, Caprice for Orchestra
- Rhapsody for Accordion and Orchestra
- Rondo for Trombone and Orchestra
- Tribunal Ritual, Descriptive Piece for Full Orchestra
- Youth of Auckland

== Awards and honours ==
- 1993 Life Member, New Zealand Accordion Association
- 1996 Appointed an Officer of the New Zealand Order of Merit, for services to music, in the 1996 Queen's Birthday Honours
- 2000 Scroll of Honour, Variety Artists Club of New Zealand
- 2005 Made a Paul Harris Fellow by the Rotary Foundation of Rotary International
- 2009 The Coupe Mondiale World Accordion Championships the Confederation Internationale des Accordeonistes (CIA) presented Daverne with the CIA Honored Friend of the Accordion Award. Also at this event he won First Prize for his commissioned solo accordion work Koriana (Maori for accordion).
- 2010 Made a Companion of North Shore City.
- 2010 Received the Benny Award from the Variety Artists Club of New Zealand Inc in recognition of a lifetime of musical excellence.
- 2011 Music Director Emeritus Auckland Symphony Orchestra

== Viscount Productions ==
Viscount Productions was established by Daverne in 1961 as a publishing house and a parent company for Viscount Records. Viscount Productions publishes and controls all music composed and recorded by Gary Daverne.

Viscount Records began as a one-man label with Daverne being the sole owner, arranger and producer, working out of Zodiac Studios in association with Eldred Stebbing.

The first 45 recording on the label was the Embers: "Rinky Dink" and "The Green Leaves of Summer". In the mid-1960s the Sierras had a hit with "The Crying Game", Cathy Howe had success with "Then He Kissed Me" and "He Doesn't Love Me", The Gendelles with "Sally Go 'Round the Roses" and "Popsicles and Icicles", and The Gremlins with "The Coming Generation".

The Viscount label is still operating and releasing New Zealand recordings and music, distributed by Ode Records and online through Amplifier.co.nz.

== Discography ==
Daverne has more than forty albums to his credit. Titles are released on Viscount Records and distributed by Ode Records and Amplifier.co.nz.

- Viscount Treasures – Gary Daverne, 50 years as a record producer
- Where Two Oceans Meet – New Zealand Easy Listening Piano Music, performed by Royce Creamer (piano)
- Koriana – New Zealand Accordion Music (Various Artists)
- Portrait of Ponsonby - Orchestral Tribute to New Zealand Places
- Pirates of the Caribbean – Movie Themes in Concert, played by the Auckland Symphony Orchestra conducted by Gary Daverne
- Mary plays Gary – Performed by American accordionist, Mary Tokarski
- Harley plays Gary – Performed by New Zealand accordionist, Harley Jones
- Kevin Plays Gary – Performed by New Zealand accordionist, Kevin Friedrich
- John Hobbs – A Man with a Mission (Words by Dorothy Tomlinson). A musical story about early New Zealand. (Various Artists) Double CD
- Accordion Concert Music – Composed by Gary Daverne, Performed by Various Artists
- Youth of Auckland – New Zealand Orchestral Music Composed by Gary Daverne, Performed by the New Zealand Symphony Orchestra. Conducted by Kenneth Young
- Gallipoli – New Zealand Orchestral Music by Gary Daverne, Performed by The Moravian Philharmonic – Czech Republic. Conducted by Petr Pololanik
- Rhapsody – New Zealand Music for Accordion and Symphony Orchestra by Gary Daverne, Performed by The Moravian Philharmonic – Czech Republic. Conducted by Petr Pololanik. Performed by The New Zealand Symphony Orchestra. Conducted by Kenneth Young
- The Other Side – New Zealand pop songs, composed and produced by Gary Daverne
- Jingles – 117 New Zealand Radio and TV Advertising Music Soundtracks, composed and produced by Gary Daverne
- Music Vaults Volume One – produced by Gary Daverne
- Music Vaults Volume Two – produced by Gary Daverne
- Gypsy Girl – A Musical Tale, Music by Gary Daverne. Words by Ruth Hamilton. Storyteller Billy T James.
- New Zealand Musical Stories for Children Volume One – composed and produced by Gary Daverne with co-writers Phil Mark and Rosemary Cranswick.
- Tales of Panapa – The Mountain Fairies, Floating Island. Narrated by David Weatherly with the Auckland Aotea Art Ed Choir
- New Zealand Musical Stories for Children Volume Two – Tiddalik the Frog, composed and produced by Gary Daverne. Words by Cheril McDonnell
- The Brothers Three – Composed and produced by Gary Daverne with co-writers Janet Grierson and Rosemary Cranswick. Narrated by David Weatherly with the Auckland Aotea Art Ed Choir
- Young Mozart – Composed and produced by Gary Daverne. With co-writers Janet Grierson and Rosemary Cranswick
- New Zealand Musical Stories for Children Volume Two – Composed by Gary Daverne. With co-writers Janet Grierson, Rosemary Cranswick and Cheril Clarke

== Media ==
- Video : "Gary Daverne - This is My Life" - A pictorial slideshow of Gary Daverne ONZM on YouTube
- Video : "The Auckland Symphony Orchestra – The First Thirty-Five Years" - A pictorial slideshow on YouTube
- Video : "Youth Of Auckland", composed by Gary Daverne. Performed by the Auckland Symphony Orchestra, 2007 China Tour on YouTube
- Video : "Gallipoli: Rhapsody for Trumpet and Orchestra", composed by Gary Daverne. Performed by the Auckland Symphony Orchestra conducted by Peter Thomas on YouTube
- Video : "Auckland March", composed by Gary Daverne. Performed by the Auckland Symphony Orchestra conducted by Gary Daverne on YouTube
- Video : "The Silver Fern March", composed by Gary Daverne. Performed by the Auckland Symphony Orchestra conducted by Peter Thomas on YouTube
- Video : "Cats of Ponsonby" (Musical) Music: Gary Daverne. Words and story: Ray Prowse. Performed by the Glen Eden Playhouse Children's Theatre group, April 2015 on YouTube
- Video : "Tales of Panapa and the Mountain Fairies", a musical composed by Gary and Rosemary Daverne, words and story by Phil Mark. Produced by Stebbing Recording Studios on YouTube
- Pirates of the Caribbean, performed by the Auckland Symphony Orchestra, Auckland Town Hall concert, November 2012
- A Musical Party, written by Gary Daverne, performed by the Auckland Symphony Orchestra with accordionist Stephanie Poole, Auckland Town Hall concert, November 2012
- Gary Daverne's YouTube channel
- "Gary Daverne and Stephanie Poole, streaming RadioNZ interview". radionz.co.nz. August 2009.
- "Gary Daverne streaming Interview". radionz.co.nz. December 2011.
