= New Zealand Chamber Soloists =

New Zealand-based chamber music ensemble

- Origin: Hamilton, New Zealand
- Genre: Classical
- Occupation: Chamber ensemble
- Years active: 2006 ongoing
- Label: Atoll Records
- Members: NZCS(Trio); Katherine Austin (piano); James Tennant (cello); Lara Hall (violin)

The New Zealand Chamber Soloists (NZCS) (established 2006), are a New Zealand based chamber music ensemble. The NZCS consists of prominent concerto soloists with national and international careers and extensive chamber music experience. The core of the ensemble is the piano trio consisting of New Zealand pianist, Katherine Austin, American-born cellist, James Tennant and violinist, Lara Hall. Other collaborators have included David Griffiths (composer) and baritone, clarinettist, Peter Scholes and harpsichord specialist, Rachel Griffith-Hughes.

The NZCS are a professional, funded ensemble, affiliated to the Conservatorium of Music at the University of Waikato and as such, undertake a wide range of musical activities. These include local and international concerts, master class presentations, recording for national radio, Concert FM and record label, Atoll, festival programmes and ongoing development of performance musicians through their teaching positions within the conservatory.

== Origins ==
The NZCS was established in 2006 and was conceived as an ensemble of varying size with a piano trio as the nucleus. Members were drawn from amongst acclaimed New Zealand based soloists with connections to the University of Waikato. The requirement of a well established solo career in addition to chamber music specialization, was established in order to create an ensemble of individual, strong instrumental voicings that would create a distinctive sound, reflecting the many layers found in New Zealand music. James Tennant and Katherine Austin (also of the Tennant-Austin duo and previously the Ogen Trio) were partnered with Dr Lara Hall, who had recently joined the staff at the Conservatorium of Music after returning from the US, to form the NZCS core trio. Through funding as a professional entity and a residency at the University of Waikato, Wel Academy of Performing Arts, the NZCS are able to maintain a continuous development of historical and contemporary repertoire to perform, tour and record.

== Current Activities ==
=== Performing ===
In 2007, the year after their formation, the New Zealand Chamber Soloists undertook the first of various collaborative projects. The piano quintets of Antonín Dvořák and Robert Schumann were performed in April 2007 at the Auckland University Theatre with the NZCS trio, violist Victoria Janecke and violinists Dimitri Atanassov and Amalia Hall playing the Dvořák and Schumann respectively. Later that year, these were performed for the Royal Overseas League International Chamber Scholarship Concert at the Gallagher Concert Chamber in Hamilton, New Zealand. Also in 2007, performances and collaborative work was performed with clarinettist Peter Scholes including the Béla Bartók Contrasts for Clarinet, Cello and Piano.

In 2008, Chamber Music New Zealand (CMNZ) commissioned the NZCS for a national tour in a year's programme that included Vienna's Eggner Trio, Takacs Quartet and Jerusalem Quartet as well as Romanian Tamas Vesmas. The six concert tour was followed up by further national tours for CMNZ in 2010 and 2011.

The year 2008 also saw the debut of Michael Williams’ triple concerto, Convergence, which was written for the NZCS (trio). This was performed with the Opus Chamber Orchestra under the baton of conductor, Dr Peter Walls in Hamilton, Rotorua and Tauranga. The same work was later performed and recorded by the NZCS (trio) with the New Zealand Symphony Orchestra in 2010, for national radio broadcaster, Concert FM.

The first international concert tour undertaken by the New Zealand Chamber Soloists was in January and February 2009. At this time they visited, Bogotá, Colombia, the United States, the United Kingdom and France. Concerts were performed at major centres as well as Clare Hall, Cambridge and the New Zealand Embassy in Paris. As a result of the performance in Colombia, an invitation was received to perform at the Pontino Festival in Italy in 2010.

The NZCS (trio) maintain a busy performance schedule as soloists and as a trio with Chamber Music New Zealand. They also perform at festivals, Katherine Austin being a founder of the Rotorua Chamber Music Festival and James Tennant, a founder of the national chamber music festival, the Adam Chamber Music Festival, in Nelson. Other notable performances have included baroque concerts with harpsichord specialist, Rachael Griffiths-Hughs, Lara Hall on baroque violin and Jennifer Shaw on recorder.

=== Recording ===
"Elegy" (released July 2010) is the first completely solo CD attributed to the NZCS Trio. Recorded and produced by Wayne Laird for New Zealand record label, Atoll, Elegy, held the number one ranking on the New Zealand Classical Charts for six weeks, a first for a chamber music recording and remained on the charts for a total of eleven weeks. The CD featured the programme of Russian composers performed on the 2009 international tour and included piano trios by Rachmaninoff, Babajanian and Shostakovich. An earlier CD, "Ahi" (released 2008), funded by Creative New Zealand and also produced by Atoll, featured the New Zealand Soloists including composer and baritone David Griffiths and clarinettist Peter Scholes. Katherine Austin and James Tennant contributed as part of the Ogen Trio, along with Dimitri Attanasov, concert master of the Auckland Philharmonia Orchestra.

=== Teaching ===
A significant aspect of the work of the NZCS is the teaching of solo instrumental and chamber music pedagogy. Austin, Hall and Tennant are lecturers and senior lecturer respectively at the University of Waikato, Conservatorium of Music, the most highly ranked institution of its kind in New Zealand. Among recent and current award-winning students have been the Leonari Trio, Rafaella Garlick-Grice and the top equal prize winner of the Beijing International Cello Competition in 2010, Santiago Canon Valencia. The NZCS also present master classes linked to their performance schedule at universities and other instructional music institutions, working individually or as a group, focused on solo and chamber music performance and technique.

== New Zealand Music ==
The NZCS is one of three fully professional chamber music ensembles in New Zealand, the others being the New Zealand String Quartet and the NZ Trio. These ensembles provide a platform for the performance of contemporary New Zealand chamber music at the highest performance levels and through recording.

"Ahi" featured commissioned works by distinguished New Zealand composers, John Psathas, Martin Lodge, Gareth Farr, Michael Williams and David Griffiths (composer). Griffiths, also a baritone and a founding member of the NZCS, was a contributing performer on the CD as was Williams. Convergence, by Williams was written for, debuted and recorded by the NZCS (trio) and composers continue to collaborate with the ensemble.

New Zealand's locality in the Pacific region means a close relationship with China. During travels to China in 2011 as well as previous international visits, the New Zealand Chamber Soloists act as representatives of New Zealand classical and contemporary art music to international audiences.
