= University of Auckland Festival Choir =

New Zealand choir

Auckland University Festival Choir
- Choir
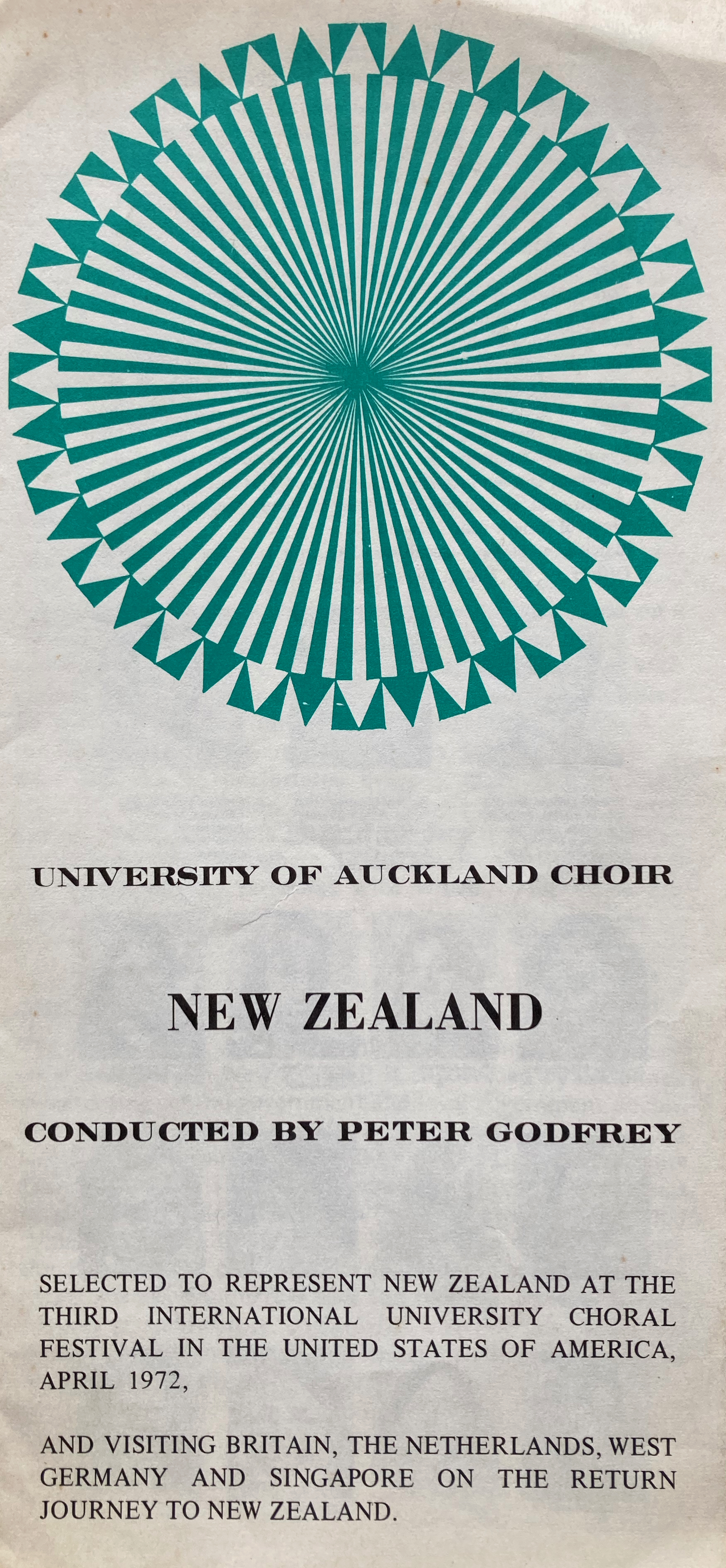
- Festival Choir brochure
- Origin: New Zealand
- Founded: 1970; 56 years ago
- Founder: Peter Godfrey
- Genre: Classical music
- Members: 40 choristers
- Music director: Peter Godfrey

The University of Auckland Festival Choir, conducted by Peter Godfrey was formed in 1970 to represent New Zealand at the third International University Choral Festival in New York in May 1972. In addition to attending the Festival the 40-voice choir toured and performed in England, the Netherland, Germany and Singapore.

== History ==
In mid-1970 Peter Godfrey formed the choir to audition for a place to attend the Festival. It was the first time a New Zealand choir had been invited to participate in the non-competitive Festival. Two earlier Festivals had been held in 1965 and 1969. Auditions were conducted by the Festival director James Bjorge who visited New Zealand in November 1970 to audition choirs in Auckland, Wellington and Dunedin. The Auckland choir was selected to represent New Zealand as a joint universities choir was considered unfeasible. When travel arrangements were investigated it was found that the cost of travel around the world was not substantially more than a return flight to New York so concerts in England, Europe and Singapore were planned.

In preparation for giving recitals the choir gave its first concert in May 1971 followed by a tour of the North Island later that year performing in Palmerston North, Wellington, Hastings, Napier, Rotorua, Tauranga and Hamilton. These were also fundraising events as the 40–voice choir had to raise the funds for travel although once in the United States the Festival covered their expenses. No funding was forthcoming from the Golden Kiwi lottery funds and only a small amount from the Queen Elizabeth II Arts Council.

Choir uniforms were designed by fashion designer Colin Cole and made of wool donated by the Wool Board. For performing the women wore a long dark bottle green dress with a bib front over a saffron-coloured blouse while the men wore a dark brown trousers with a saffron shirt. For day wear the women had an emerald green suit and the men dark brown trousers and cinnamon-coloured jacket. The choir logo on souvenir programmes and brochures, consisting of lines representing the 40 choristers radiating from a harmonic centre, was designed by artist Richard Wolfe.

The choir undertook its tour to the United States, England, the Netherlands, Germany and Singapore between 7 April and 16 May 1972. During April the choir toured the East Coast for ten days giving recitals at high school and university campuses. The tour included Suffolk Community College in Selden, Long Island; Fairleigh Dickinson University, Madison, New Jersey; West Chester State College, Pennsylvania; Philadelphia; Wilde Lake High School, Columbia, Maryland; Ferguson High School, Newport News, Virginia; the University of North Carolina, Chapel Hill; Stratford College, Danville, Virginia; Southern Seminary Junior College, Buena Vista, Virginia. At Ferguson High School the school library caught fire during the concert; after evacuating the choir continued to sing in the car park including the madrigal Fire Fire My Heart by Thomas Morley.

After the tour the choir joined the 15 other choirs in Washington D.C. to perform in the Kennedy Center and attend a reception at the White House hosted by Pat Nixon, First Lady of the United States.

The choirs then moved to New York for the Festival where they performed at the United Nations, conducted by Willi Gohl and at the Lincoln Center, conducted by Robert Shaw. Under Shaw the massed choirs sang among other things Dona Nobis Pacem from the B Minor Mass by Bach, the Hallelujah Chorus by Handel, the spiritual Soon Ah will be Done, the Echo Madrigal by di Lasso and Gaudeamus Igitur by Brahms.

After the Festival the choir travelled to England on 1 May. Invitations had been received to sing at Westminster Abbey and in the chapel at King's College, University of Cambridge. En route from London to Cambridge the choir visited The Maltings, Snape having been invited to visit by composer Benjamin Britten and tenor Peter Pears. The purpose of the visit was for Britten and Pears to meet a choir member, Christopher Lackner, who was the first recipient of a Pears-Britten Award, a scholarship set up by Britten and Pears in 1970 on a visit to Auckland. In the Maltings Concert Hall Lackner sang for Britten and Pears and the choir gave a short recital which included Ghosts, Fire, Water. They also made an impromptu visit to the convent at Hengrave Hall, the home of composer John Wilbye, where they sang his madrigal Sweet Honey-Sucking Bees.

The choir then travelled to the Netherlands giving a concert in the church of St Servaas in Maastricht, followed by concerts at the Orangerie at Schloss Benrath in Düsseldorf and at St Andrew's Cathedral in Singapore.

On its return to New Zealand the choir performed in Auckland at the closing of the Auckland Festival on 27 May. It was lauded in the press as the "best choir New Zealand has produced" and in July 1972, it gave a concert in Christchurch where its "supreme music" was likewise praised.

== Repertoire ==
The choir sang secular and sacred music and included 16 works by New Zealand composers in their repertoire. Audiences and choral conductors were interested in the works by contemporary New Zealand composers and by Douglas Mews's Ghosts, Fire, Water in particular. As there was particular interest in Māori songs Mews arranged three songs for the choir: Hoki Hoki, Akoaka O te Rangi and Pōkarekare Ana.

Works by New Zealanders included Lord, when the sense of Thy sweet grace by John Ritchie; An heavenly song by Donald Byars; Qui natus est by Gillian Whitehead; People look East by Jack Body; Dormi Jesu by David Griffiths; Estas in exilium by Nigel Eastgate; Three of a kind by David Farquhar and Blow me eyes by John Wells. Some music was composed especially for the choir: Tenera Juventa by Ronald Tremain (words from Carmina Burana), And is there care in heaven? a motet by Thomas Rive (words by Edmund Spenser), and Ghosts, Fire, Water by Douglas Mews. Ghosts, Fire, Water was a setting of a poem from British poet James Kirkup's anthology No more Hiroshimas: poems and translations, which was based on three of the Hiroshima Panels. Kirkup's poem ends with the words “Forgive us that we had to see your passion to remember / What we must never again deny: Love one another.” Mews had this phrase spoken against the plainchant hymn, 'Ubi caritas et amor, Deus ibi est (Where charity and love are, there God abides)'. Different singers then called out ''Love one another in the languages of the choirs attending the Festival: Poland, West Germany, Hungary, Czechoslovakia, Denmark, the Netherlands, France, Great Britain, Uganda, Argentina, Brazil, the US, Japan, Korea, India, and New Zealand (in Māori). Audiences were profoundly moved by Ghosts, Fire, Water with the audience in Maastricht giving it a standing ovation.

The choir's standard repertoire for a programme consisted of Jubilate Deo by Orlando di Lasso, the Agnus Dei from the Mass for Four Voices by William Byrd, the double motet Warum Ist Das Licht Gegeben? by Brahms, Ghosts, Fire, Water by Douglas Mews and Tenera Juventa by Ronald Tremain.

At the Lincoln Center concert the choir sang the following works: Jubilate Deo by Orlando di Lasso, Sweet Honey-Sucking Bees by John Wilbye, Tenera Juventa by Ronald Tremain and Ghosts, Fire, Water by Douglas Mews.

== Legacy ==
After attending the Festival the choir was renamed the Auckland University Singers and toured Australia in 1974 and 1980. Godfrey retired as conductor in 1982 and was succeeded by Peter Watts and Karen Grylls.

A silver jubilee reunion of the Festival Choir and Auckland University Singers was held in 1995.

== Alumni ==
Composer Derek Williams was a member of the choir.

== Recordings ==
- University of Auckland Festival choir: on world tour. Kiwi Records. SLD-34 : Kiwi. 1973. OCLC 992284968.
- Choral works. Kiwi Records. SLD-31: Kiwi. 1973. OCLC 960980948.
