= Susan Frykberg =

New Zealand composer (1954–2023)

- Born: 10 October 1954; Hastings, New Zealand
- Died: 7 April 2023 (aged 68); Whanganui, New Zealand

Susan Frykberg (10 October 1954 – 7 April 2023) was a New Zealand author, electroacoustic composer, and sound artist. She also composed acoustic music in a variety of genres.

== Life ==
Susan Frykberg was born in Hastings, New Zealand, and studied at the University of Canterbury and the University of Otago, studying under, among others, John Rimmer, Barry Vercoe, Barry Conyngham, and Iannis Xenakis. She moved to Canada in 1979 and worked as a freelance composer in Toronto until a move to Vancouver in 1986, to complete a master's degree at Simon Fraser University with Barry Truax. She taught in the School of Communication at Simon Fraser University for seven years.

Frykberg was a long-time member of the Association of Canadian Women Composers, and helped to found both the World Forum of Acoustic Ecology and the Canadian Electroacoustic Community. She published a variety of papers on subjects related to electronic music, including computer music, and also wrote poetry.

She served as a guest lecturer at the Ontario College of Art (Toronto), Emily Carr College (Vancouver), Auckland University, RMIT University (Melbourne), and Box Hill Institute of TAFE (Melbourne). She is survived by one son.

=== The Audio Birth Project ===
The Audio Birth Project, a suite of four movements, was one of Frykberg's most important projects. Funding was granted by the Canada Council, and revolved around concepts of giving birth and going into labor. Frykberg interviewed family members, including her mother and sisters, and combined audio recordings of their spoken words with instrumental accompaniment, including cello, violin, and piano. Critics reviewed the work as "primal, cathartic" and "an emotional chisel."

=== Critical reception ===
Frykberg's album, Astonishing Sense of being taken over by something far greater than Me, received critical accolades, including a review by Anna Robin in the Computer Music Journal who called the CD a "tour de force in both composition and subject." Another review described Astonishing Sense as a "thought-provoking work," that "...offers substantial merit, not least because of the excellent writing for the violin." Her earlier work, Transonances, was reviewed less positively.

== Works ==
Frykberg composed electroacoustic works. Selected compositions include:

- Mother Too
- Insect Life
- Birth/Rebirth Bearing Me
- Audio Birth Project
- Margaret
- Astonishing Sense
- I Didn’t Think Much About It
- Sue and Kathy Telecompose across the Country

Her works have been recorded and issued on media including:

- Astonishing Sense Of Being Taken Over By Something Greater Than Me (CD) Earsay Productions, 1998
- Transonances (Cass, Ltd) Underwhich Audiographics, 1984
- harangue I (CD) Earsay, 1998
