= Auckland Symphony Orchestra =

Community-based symphony orchestra

- Orchestra
- Short name: ASO
- Founded: 1975
- Location: Auckland, New Zealand
- Concert hall: Auckland Town Hall
- Website: www.aucklandsymphony.co.nz

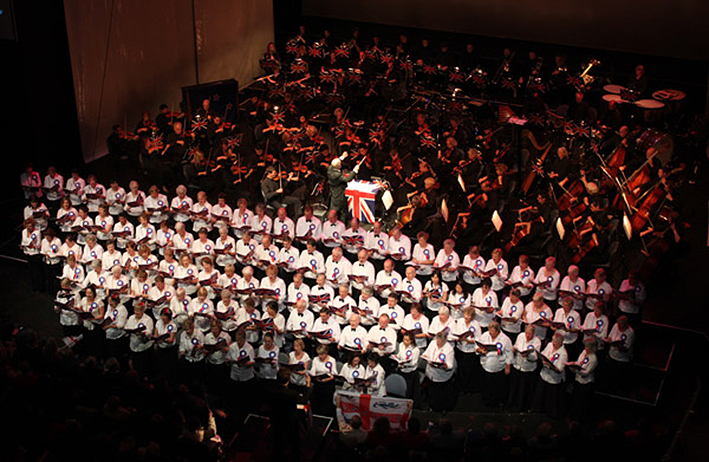
The Auckland Symphony Orchestra in concert at the Last Night of the Proms in 2004

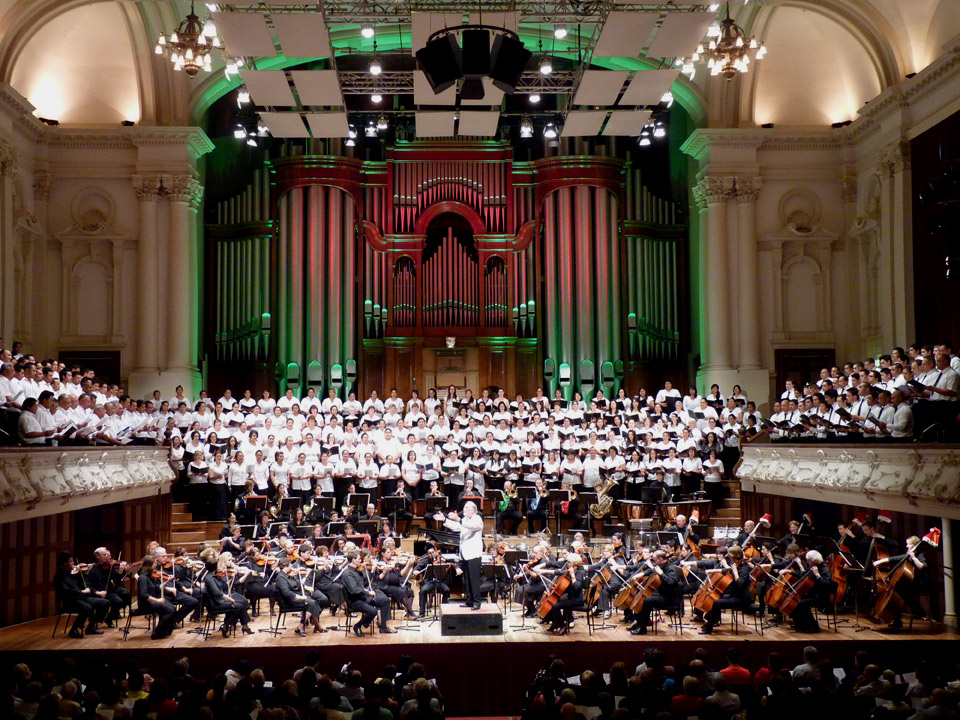
Carol Concert 2010 Auckland Town Hall. Auckland Symphony Orchestra, conductor Gary Daverne, with combined Pacific Island Church choirs

The Auckland Symphony Orchestra (ASO) is a New Zealand community-based symphony orchestra formed in 1975 by founding musical director Gary Daverne ONZM.

The ASO has developed a following and reputation for high quality performances of popular classics from the symphonic repertoire and music from stage and screen, often playing to capacity and turn-away audiences.

Its eighty-plus players are drawn from all parts of Auckland and from all walks of life, including professional people who have chosen a career outside of music. The ASO provides an opportunity to these people to enjoy weekly rehearsals of symphonic music, playing without payment and purely for the pleasure of making good music together. It also supports local young soloists, giving them the opportunity to perform in concert with a full symphony orchestra.

The orchestra's main philosophy is that music should be fun and enjoyed by players and audiences alike – hence the regular Free Family concerts that are offered in Auckland with out-of-town concerts in areas where a live performance by a symphony orchestra is a rare event.

Regular annual features of the orchestra are the Free Family concerts, performances of Last Night of the Proms and the Christmas Sing Along with local Pacific Island church choirs.

Since 2013, ASO has also made annual tours to the Bay of Islands, New Zealand, to perform at the Kerikeri Turner Centre.

== History ==
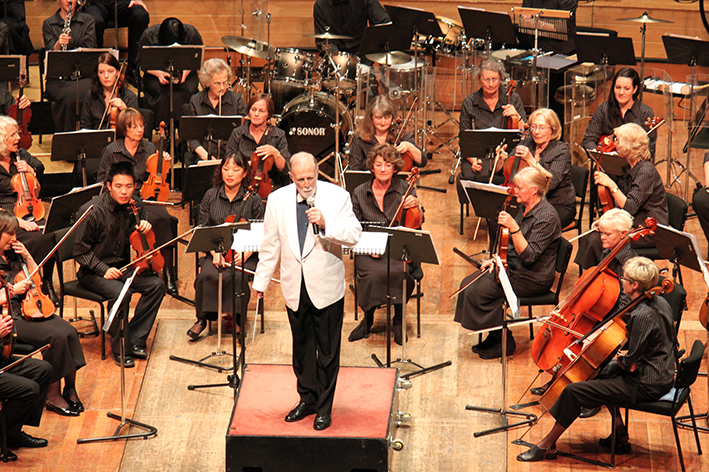
Founder and Musical Director Gary Daverne ONZM with the Auckland Symphony Orchestra

The Auckland Symphony Orchestra was formed as a result of a 30th anniversary reunion of players from the Auckland Junior Symphony Orchestra (JSO, known today as the Auckland Youth Orchestra) and a surprise 60th birthday party of its former long term conductor, Dr Charles Nalden.

Gary Daverne, a former clarinettist of the JSO and then a musical theatre conductor, was given the task of directing the reunion orchestra of some eighty players. Music was chosen from past programmes, on only three rehearsals. The full contingent of players did not appear until the performance night.

Based upon the success of the reunion many of the players expressed an interest for forming a permanent orchestra. Gary Daverne was chosen as music director and conductor and along with the administrative skills of Patricia Goddard, a former contra bass player in the JSO and a very strong, dedicated lady, the Music Players of Auckland was formed with approximately forty players. They gave their first concert in November 1975 and quickly expanded in size to over sixty players. Two years later the name was changed to the Auckland Symphony Orchestra.

Patricia Goddard retired from the orchestra in the late 1980s and Gary Daverne ONZM retired in December 2010 after thirty-five years at the helm. Peter Thomas, an Auckland-based conductor and music educator, was appointed as Gary's successor and remained the music director and conductor until his resignation from the orchestra following a sexual misconduct investigation in 2021. Since Peter Thomas' resignation, the orchestra continues to operate inviting guest conductors on a concert by concert basis.

== Concert halls ==
In the beginning years the orchestra made its home at St. Mary's Anglican Cathedral in Parnell, moving in the early 1990s to the newly constructed Aotea Centre and Bruce Mason Centre concert halls and later to the refurbished Auckland Town Hall.

== 2007 China tour ==
In April 2007 the Auckland Symphony Orchestra with conductor Gary Daverne toured China, where they performed successful concerts to large, enthusiastic and appreciative audiences in the cities of Shanghai, Shi Jia Zhuang and Beijing. The concerts in Beijing and Shanghai were televised and the Shanghai concert was screened for one hour on prime time television (Sunday evening 7 – 8pm), to an estimated viewing audience of 143 million. Politicians, high-ranking government officials and dignitaries attended all concerts.

== Gallery ==
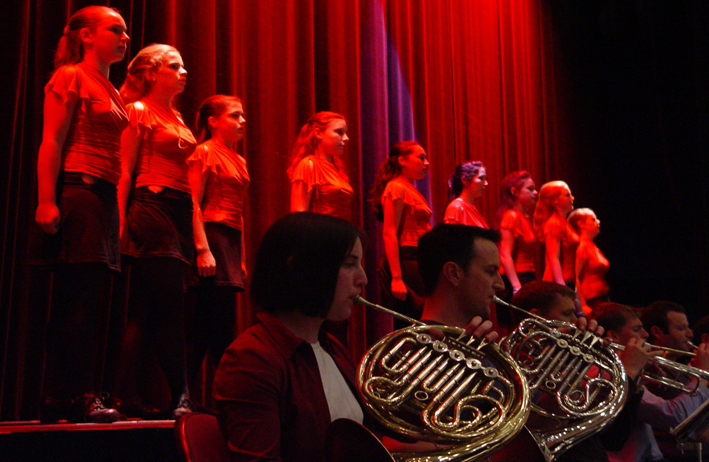
Auckland Symphony Orchestra with Irish Dancers at the Last Night of the Proms, Bruce Mason Centre

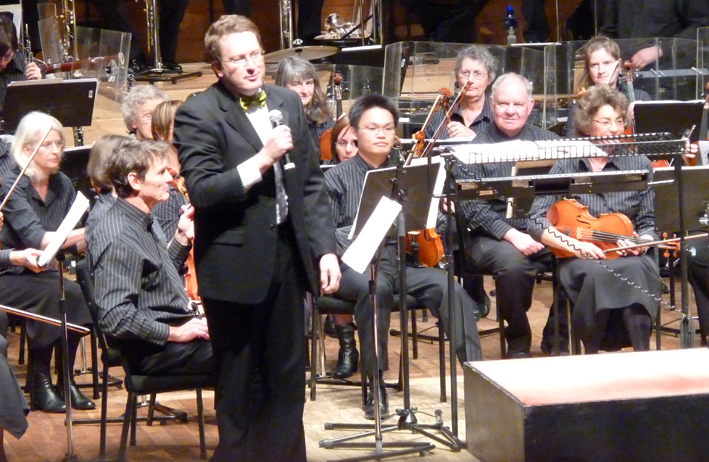
Former Auckland Symphony Conductor Peter Thomas with the Orchestra

== Media ==
- Youth of Auckland, written by Gary Daverne, performed by the Auckland Symphony Orchestra, China Tour 2007, televised by CTV Channel 9 to an estimated 143 million viewers
- The Auckland March, written by Gary Daverne, performed by the Auckland Symphony Orchestra, Auckland Town Hall concert, November 2010
- Pirates of the Caribbean, performed by the Auckland Symphony Orchestra, Auckland Town Hall concert, November 2012
- A Musical Party, written by Gary Daverne, performed by the Auckland Symphony Orchestra with accordionist Stephanie Poole, Auckland Town Hall concert, November 2012
