= Eden Hore =

New Zealand farmer and collector (1919–1997)

James Eden Hore (28 September 1919 – 15 May 1997) was a New Zealand farmer and collector of 1970s and 1980s women's couture fashion by New Zealand fashion designers. The collection is maintained by the Eden Hore Central Otago Trust.

== Biography ==
Hore was born in 1919 in Naseby. He attended Kyeburn School and lived at Glenshee Station, a sheep and cattle farm, near Naseby. In World War II he served as a gunner with the Second New Zealand Expeditionary Force in Egypt and Italy.

Hore's interest in fashion was sparked by Alma McElwain, a model, who worked for Hore as a 'land girl' and housekeeper from 1960 to 1972. Initially he collected garments made of wool and leather but the collection expanded until it grew to more than 270 garments and accessories. It included creations by top designers such as Kevin Berkahn, Colin Cole, Lewis Townsend, Barbara Herrick and Vinka Lucas. During the 1970s Hore made items from his collection available for fundraising fashion shows in New Zealand and to Australia. Many of the garments were displayed in Glenshee Park a tourism attraction Hore opened in 1975 on the remaining 100ha of the station after he had sold the majority of the land. The fashion display was alongside Hore's other collections which included taxidermied animals, dolls, plates, spoons and fabrics. He also maintained a collection of exotic animals and trees, and formal gardens.

Hore died in 1997 in Ranfurly. After his death his collections were sent to auction but his niece and nephew Margaret and John Steele intervened to stop the fashion collection from being sold. The Central Otago District Council bought the collection in 2013 for $40,000. Three more pieces were purchased from the estate of Alma McElwain after she died in 2022 and donated to the collection anonymously.

== Legacy ==
The Eden Hore Central Otago Trust works to preserve, exhibit and promote the collection. The collection has been displayed at the Dowse Art Museum in 2021, at the Alexandra Museum in 2024 and Toitū Otago Settlers Museum in 2025.

A book about the collection Central Otago Couture: The Eden Hore Collection, with photos by Derek Henderson, was published in 2025.
