= The Radiance of the King =

1954 novel by Camara Laye

- Cover of 2001 edition
- Author: Camara Laye
- Original title: Le Regard du roi
- Translator: James Kirkup
- Language: French
- Genre: Fiction
- Publisher: The New York Review of Books (English translation)
- Publication date: 1954
- English publication date: 2001

The Radiance of the King (Le Regard du roi, 1954) is the second novel by Guinean writer Camara Laye. The novel tells the story of Clarence, a European man who, as he progresses through an African environment, is stripped of his Western ways.

== Background ==
The Radiance of the King, Laye's second book, was published in 1954. The book depicts a man's journey which leads him to be stripped of his Western ways. As Clarence makes his way through this journey, he is met with many obstacles. He is put into a position that leaves him to conform to this new environment.

== Summary ==
A European man named Clarence finds himself on a journey in West Africa in search of a king after a shipwreck. When he arrives, he gets involved with an old beggar, and two boys, Nagoa and Noaga. The old beggar has intentions of guiding Clarence south, to where the king is likely to be. During this trip, Clarence gets lost and gets weary of the beggar's guide. Eventually, they arrive in a town called Aziana. The beggar secretly sells Clarence as a slave to the naba, in exchange for a donkey. There, Clarence is visited nightly by a woman who vanishes before dawn. He impregnates women sent by the naba's harem, and is being used to produce "café-au-lait" children (a term that could refer to mixed-race children). Clarence soon hears about the king's arrival in Aziana. He gains permission to watch the king's arrival. In the end, Clarence finally meets the king. The ending of the book has been considered as somewhat ambiguous and can be interpreted various ways. The many interpretations can be attributed to the vast amount of symbolism used throughout the story. Laye is thought to have purposely conceived such a multifarious ending leading to Clarence's success in meeting the king.

== Publication ==
The novel was originally published in 1954 in French as Le Regard du roi by Plon. It was later translated into English by James Kirkup as The Radiance of the King and published in 1956 by Collins. It was republished in 1965 in Great Britain by William Collins's Fontana Books, and in the United States by the Macmillan Company in 1971. It was also republished in 2001 by the New York Review of Books.
