= The African Child =

1953 novel by Camara Laye

- First English-language edition
- Author: Camara Laye
- Translator: James Kirkup
- Language: French
- Genre: Autobiographical
- Publisher: Plon
- Publication date: 1953
- Publication place: Guinea
- English publication date: 1954, Noonday Press

The African Child (French: L'Enfant noir) is an autobiographical French novel by Camara Laye published in 1953. It tells the story of a young African child, Baba, growing up in Guinea. The novel won the Prix Charles Veillon writing prize.

It was translated into English by James Kirkup and Ernest Jones and published in the United States by Noonday Press in 1954 as The Dark Child and in the United Kingdom by Collins 1955. This translation was later republished under the title The African Child in 1959.

== Adaptations ==
The novel was adapted into a movie called L'Enfant noir in 1995. Many of the cast in the film were relatives of Laye.

== Critical reception ==
The scenes early in the novel, when the young narrator witnesses his father working with gold, have drawn considerable critical attention for their spiritual overtones, but also because of the importance of the douga, the song and dance begun by the griot when the work is complete.

== Publication history ==
- The Dark Child: The Autobiography of an African Boy (New York: Noonday Press, 1954)
- The Dark Child: The Autobiography of an African Boy (London: Collins, 1955)
- The African Child: Memories of a West African Childhood (London: Fontana, 1959)
