= Peter Godfrey (choral conductor) =

New Zealand conductor (1922–2017)

- Born: 3 April 1922; Bluntisham, England
- Died: 28 September 2017 (aged 95)
- Education: Denstone College

Peter David Hensman Godfrey CBE (3 April 1922 – 28 September 2017) was an English-born New Zealand choral conductor. He was Professor of Music at the University of Auckland and conducted numerous choirs including the Dorian Choir in Auckland, choirs of St Mary's Cathedral and Holy Trinity Cathedral in Auckland and the Wellington Cathedral of St Paul, the University of Auckland Festival Choir, Auckland University Singers, the Orpheus Choir in Wellington and the New Zealand Youth Choir.

== Early life and education ==
Born in Bluntisham in 1922, Godfrey began his musical career at age nine as a chorister in the King's College Chapel Choir at Cambridge University. After secondary school at Denstone College, he studied music at King's, where he was also a bass choral scholar in the choir. He gained a MusB in 1943, a BA in 1946 and MA in 1951.

== Career in England ==
Godfrey served in World War II in the King's African Rifles from 1942 to 1945. After the war he attended the Royal College of Music then took up teaching positions including Marlborough College where he was Director of Music from 1954 to 1958.

== Career in New Zealand ==
In 1958 he emigrated to New Zealand to become music director at St Mary's Cathedral and Holy Trinity Cathedral and lecturer in music at the University of Auckland. He was Professor at the university from 1974 to 1982. On becoming a Professor he gave up conducting at the Cathedral due to the workload.

From 1959 to 1968 he conducted the Auckland String Players which became the Auckland Symphonia. He conducted the Dorian Choir from 1961 to 1983, taking the choir on tours to Europe in 1975 and 1977, where they performed at the BBC Proms in London and at the Three Choirs Festival.

Godfrey formed the University of Auckland Festival Choir in 1970 to represent New Zealand at the third International University Choral Festival in New York in 1972. After the choir's tour he renamed the choir the Auckland University Singers, taking them on tour to Australia in 1974. He conducted the choir until 1978 and was succeeded by Peter Watts and Karen Grylls.

In 1978 he returned to King's College for four months, arranging a swap with King's director of music Philip Ledger who came to Auckland. This was the first time since the 16th century that someone had been a chorister, choral scholar and director of the choir at King's.

On moving to live in Wellington in 1983 he conducted the choir of Wellington Cathedral of St Paul from 1983 to 1989 and the Orpheus Choir from 1984 to 1991.

From 1982 to 1988 Godfrey conducted the New Zealand Youth Choir. He took the choir to the International Festival of Youth and Music in Vienna in 1988 where they won the Best Choir award. He founded the New Zealand Choral Federation in 1985.

In 1989 he was invited to take up a two year position as Director of Music at Trinity College in Melbourne from 1990 to 1991. On his retirement to Waikanae in 1992 he conducted the Kāpiti Chamber Choir and the Kāpiti Chorale as well as playing the organ and conducting the choir at St Michael's Church in Waikanae.

== Honours and awards ==
Godfrey was appointed an Officer of the Order of the British Empire in the 1978 New Year Honours, and promoted to Commander of the same order in the 1988 Birthday Honours, both for services to music. In 2005, he received a Arts Foundation of New Zealand Icon Award.

== Legacy ==
Godfrey had a significant influence on the development and growth of choral music in New Zealand. He has been called "the 'father' of NZ choral music".

Godfrey died on 28 September 2017.

Godfrey was the grandfather of New Zealand jazz musician and broadcaster Nick Tipping.
