= Michael F. Williams =

- Born: 1962 (age 63–64); New Zealand
- Genres: Contemporary classical, opera, chamber, electronic
- Occupation: Composer
- Labels: Atoll
- Website: www.michaelfwilliams.co.nz

Michael F. Williams (born 1962, New Zealand) is a composer of contemporary classical music. He has received commissions from many of New Zealand's major musical institutions such as the New Zealand Symphony Orchestra, NBR New Zealand Opera and Chamber Music New Zealand and his work is regularly broadcast on Radio New Zealand Concert. A lecturer in composition at the University of Waikato, Williams has received recognition in the NZSO-SOUNZ Readings on three occasions and in the SOUNZ Contemporary Award in 2012 for his multimedia World War II opera, The Juniper Passion.

== Discography ==
Selected Works

- The Juniper Passion, Atoll Records
- The Prodigal Child, Atoll Records
- Rozmowa/Dialogue, Atoll Records
- Ahi, Atoll Records
- Breathe, Atoll Records

== Awards ==
Selected Awards

- NZSO-SOUNZ Readings 2001: Synaesthesia
- NZSO-SOUNZ Readings 2008: In Saecula Saeculorum
- NZSO-SOUNZ Readings 2010: Convergence - Triple Concerto
- SOUNZ Contemporary Award 2012: The Juniper Passion
