= Anna Leese =

New Zealand opera singer

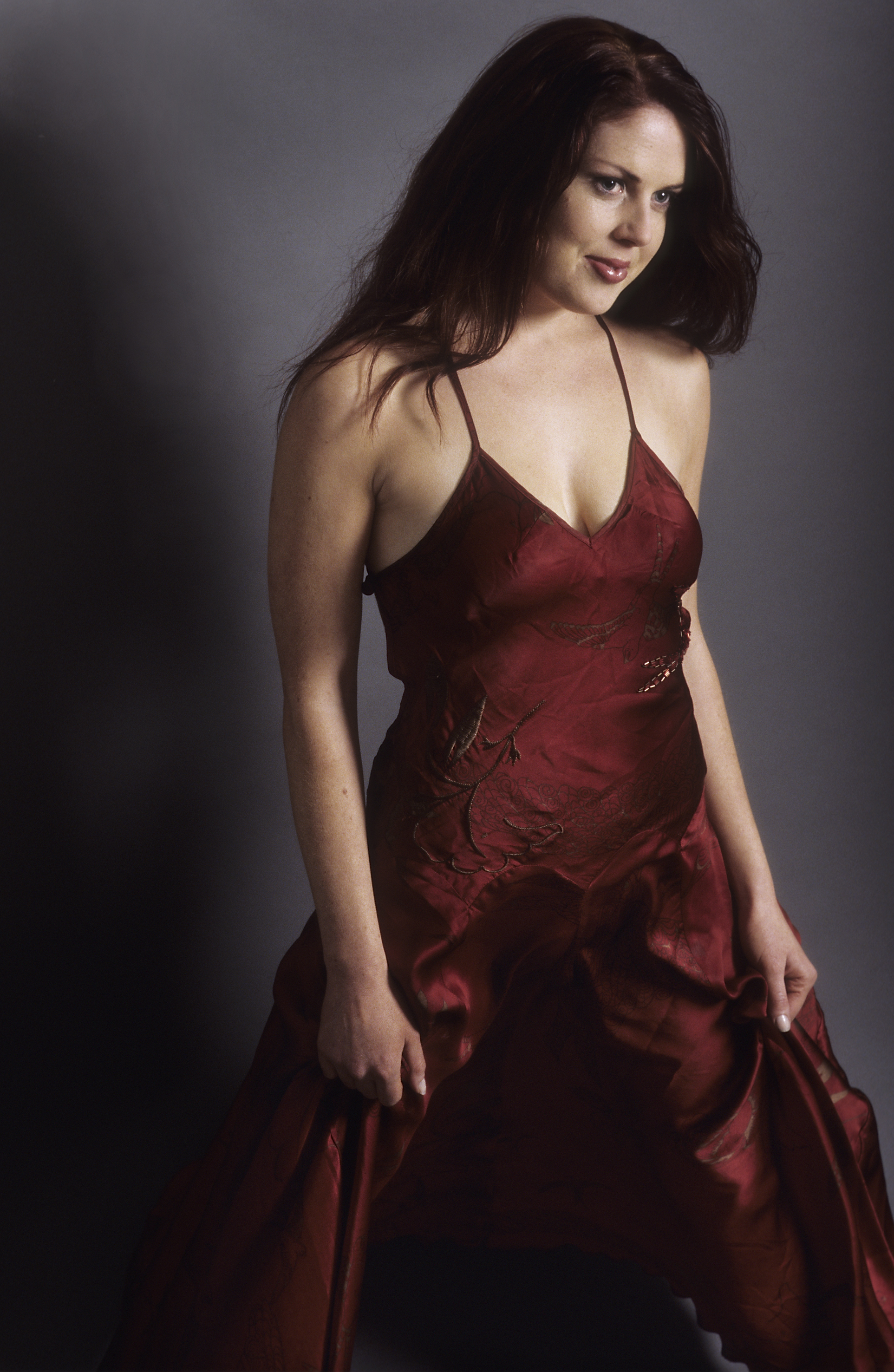
Anna Leese, lyric soprano, 2007

Anna Leese (born 7 March 1981) is a New Zealand born soprano opera singer.

== Early life ==
Leese was born in Napier, New Zealand. She sang in the New Zealand Secondary Schools Choir and the New Zealand Youth Choir. She attended the University of Otago where she studied music, graduating in 2003. This was followed by study at the Benjamin Britten International Opera School at the Royal College of Music in London.

== Career ==
Leese sang the part of Tamiri in Mozart's Il re pastore in 2006 at the Lindbury Theatre, Royal Opera House, Covent Garden. Also in 2006, she was understudy for Musetta in Puccini's La Boheme at Covent Garden, followed in 2008 by performing the role at Covent Garden. Another Covent Garden engagement was as Micaela in Carmen.

She performed with José Carreras in Gateshead in 2008. She made her North American debut as Musetta for the Canadian Opera Company in April 2009.

She has sung the role of Tatyana in Eugene Onegin three times: for the New Zealand Opera in 2009 for Opera Flanders in Ghent and Antwerp in 2010, and in London in 2012. Other roles she has performed are Fiordiligi in Mozart's Cosi fan tutte and Donna Elvira in Don Giovanni. She has appeared with Opera Köln, the Flanders Opera and Opera Holland Park.

She is also was one of the artists who formed the vocal-piano ensemble The Prince Consort in Britain.

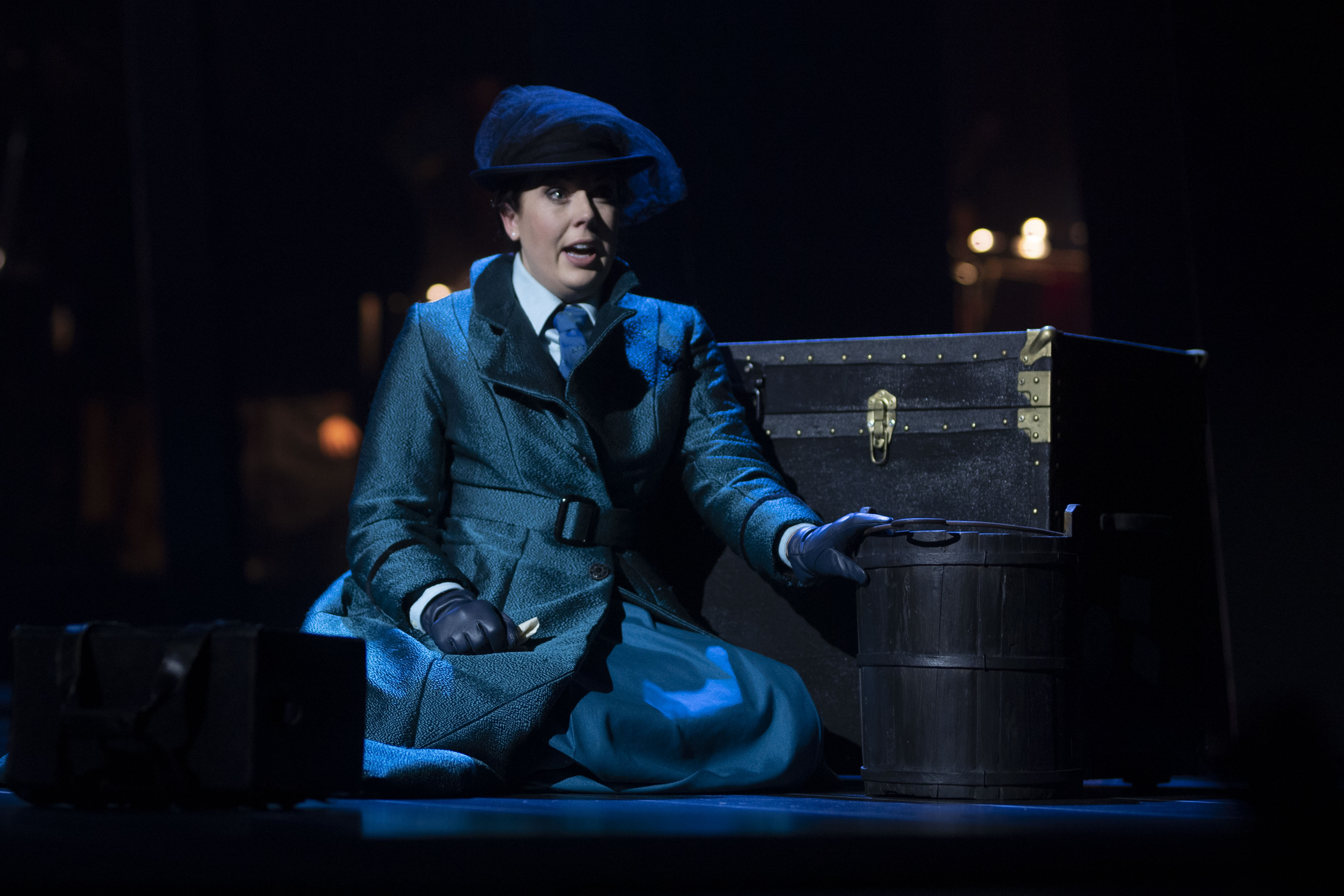
As the Governess in the 2019 New Zealand Opera production of Benjamin Britten's The Turn of the Screw

In addition to her international career she has performed many times in New Zealand. In 2005 she performed in the Messiah in several performances around New Zealand and sang with Kiri Te Kanawa and Frederica von Stade in Wellington in 2006. She toured a chamber music concert programme with pianist Terence Dennis in 2008. She also sang with Andrea Bocelli at his New Zealand concert in 2008. She then also served as Artist in Residence for the New Zealand Singing School in Napier 2011. Leese with other singers and a pianist formed the Tākiri Ensemble which made its debut tour in 2015, singing a programme of lieder. In 2016 Leese was soloist in Anthony Ritchie's oratorio Gallipoli to the Somme which commemorated the one hundred year anniversary of the Battle of the Somme. It was based on the book of the same name by Alexander Aitken, who was a soldier in the Otago battalion and later professor of mathematics at Edinburgh University. The oratorio had its European premiere, with Leese as a soloist, at the Sheldonian Theatre, Oxford in June 2018. In 2019 Leese and the Tākiri Ensemble performed singer-songwriter Bic Runga's first classical composition. The same year she performed as the Governess in Britten's The Turn of the Screw in Auckland.

In 2021 Leese and tenor Simon O'Neill performed together with the Dunedin Symphony Orchestra.

Leese teaches voice at the University of Otago.

== Awards ==
Leese won the Mobil Song Quest (later the Lexus Song Quest) in 2002 and the MacDonald's Aria Scholarship at the Sydney Opera House in 2003. She received a New Generation Award from the New Zealand Arts Foundation in 2010.

== Personal life ==
Leese married Italian winemaker Stefano Guidi in 2014 and the couple returned to live in New Zealand. In 2016 just before the birth of their first child Guidi was diagnosed with motor neurone disease. In 2020 the couple had their second child, who was born during the COVID-19 lockdown. They live in Dunedin.

A variety of rose has been named after Leese.
