= Dorothy Ker =

New Zealand-born composer

Dorothy Ker (born 1965) is a New Zealand-born composer of instrumental and vocal music who has lived in the UK since 1992. She is known for her inter-disciplinary collaborations and experimentation with live electronic music performances.

== Early life ==
Ker was born in Carterton, in the North Island of New Zealand in 1965.

== Education ==
Ker completed B.Mus and M.Mus degrees at the University of Auckland, where she studied composition and electronic music with John Rimmer and Douglas Mews. She emigrated to the UK in 1992, and completed a Ph.D in composition at the University of York in 1998.

== Career ==
Following her graduation, Ker took up a position at the University of Reading. She later moved to the position of Research Fellow at the University of Sheffield, before becoming a lecturer in Composition there, and most recently, a Senior Lecturer in Music.

In 2008, a collaboration with the mathematician Marcus du Sautoy resulted in the creation and performance of a piece of experimental music, The 19th Step. The research with du Sautoy was later the basis for a mixed-media theatre piece produced in collaboration with the sculptor Kate Allen in 2010.

In July 2013, Ker began a year-long position in Wellington, New Zealand, as a Research Teaching Associate at the New Zealand School of Music.

In 2015, Ker received the 2015 Composers Association of New Zealand Trust Fund Award for her contribution to music composition.

Ker's music has been heard at international festivals in Auckland, Belfast, Darmstadt, Huddersfield, Perth, Taipei, Seoul, at the International Society for Contemporary Music, in London and on BBC Radio 3 and Radio New Zealand.

== Works ==
- Movement for String Orchestra
- The Structure of Memory (mixed chamber ensemble of 10 players)
- diffracted terrains: duo i (bass clarinet and double bass)
- diffracted terrains: duo ii (vioin, French horn and piano)
- diffracted terrains: quintet (alto/bass flute, clarinet in A/bass clarinet, violin, viola and cello)
- solo for cello
- water mountain (violin, B flat clarinet and cello)
- [...and...1] (clarinet)
- [...and...11] (for 12 players)
- Clepsydra (oboe)
- On the Bridge (solo soprano)
- Le kaleidoscope de l’obscurite (clarinet, bass clarinet, cello, double bass)
- The Third Dream (orchestra)
- Rare Earth (cello)
- face (flute)
- fantasia (solo flute and orchestra)
- the history of rock (piano)
- Sonatine (violin and piano)
- a gentle infinity (orchestra)
- The Rock, Whatipu (solo soprano)
- Close-Up of a Daisy (a cappella choir)
- Arise, Shine! (choir and organ)
- If all the world were paper
- Koru (choir and piano)
- City (female voices and piano)
- Darkness and Light (orchestra)
- from States of Zero (solo violin)
- Dances After the Haiku (soprano, viola, clarinet, cello and piano)
- these children singing in stone a (a cappella choir)
- Behind the Apple Cases at Mapua (a cappella choir and solo soprano)
- Dreams from Stone Landscapes (soprano with flute/piccolo, oboe, clarinet)
- Winter Dusk (unaccompanied choir)
- and the rain ... (choir)
- six pieces locating the body (B flat clarinet and bass clarinet)
- The Truth of Fire (vocal ensemble (12 voices) and unseen narrator)

== Recordings ==
- The Structure of Memory on New Zealand Women Composers (2003)
- Diffracted Terrains - Chamber Music of Dorothy Ker (2008)
- [...and...1] on A Place in the Sky
- Clepsydra on New Music for a New Oboe Volume 2
