= Wayan Yudane =

Indonesian-born New Zealand musician

I Wayan Gde Yudane (born 1963 or 1964) is a gangsa player and an exponent of Balinese music in New Zealand.

Yudane learnt to play gamelan from his father, an architect and gamelan instrument maker. He attended the Performing Arts School (STSI) in Denpasar.

In 2002, he became the 2002 Artist-in-Residence at Victoria University of Wellington in New Zealand.

His work, Entering the Stream, has been performed and acclaimed internationally.

His collaboration with Paul Grabowsky, The Theft of Sita, was performed at the 2001 Next Wave Festival in New York City and toured Europe and the US. He also collaborated with New Zealand composer Jack Body on Paradise Regained for piano and pemade (Balinese metallophone).

In 2018, he performed at the International Gamelan Festival in Fort Vastenburg in Surakarta, Central Java.
