= Camara Laye =

Guinean author (1928–1980)

- Born: January 1, 1928; Kouroussa, French Guinea
- Died: February 4, 1980 (aged 52); Dakar, Senegal
- Occupation: Writer
- Writing career
- Notable works: The African Child; The Radiance of the King
- Notable awards: Prix Charles Veillon

Camara Laye (January 1, 1928 – February 4, 1980) was a writer from Guinea. His most well-known works are The African Child (L'Enfant noir), a novel based loosely on his own childhood, and The Radiance of the King (Le Regard du roi). Both novels are among the earliest major works in Francophone African literature. Camara Laye later worked for the government of newly independent Guinea, but went into voluntary exile over political issues.

== Early life ==
Camara Laye was born in Kouroussa, a town in what was then the colony of French Guinea. His family were Malinke (a Mandé-speaking ethnicity), and he was born into a system where he had to follow his forefathers footsteps who traditionally worked as blacksmiths and goldsmiths. His mother was from the village of Tindican, and his immediate childhood surroundings were not predominantly influenced by French culture.

He attended both Quranic and French elementary schools in Kouroussa. At the age of 15 he went to Conakry, the colonial capital, to continue his education. He attended vocational studies in motor mechanics. In 1947, he travelled to Paris to continue studying mechanics. There he worked and took further courses in engineering and worked towards the baccalauréat.

== Writing career ==
Camara Laye published his first novel in 1953, the autobiographical L'Enfant noir (The African Child, first published as The Dark Child). It follows his own journey from childhood in Kouroussa, his education in Conakry, and eventual departure for France. The book won the Prix Charles Veillon in 1954. L'Enfant noir was followed the next year by Le Regard du roi (The Radiance of the King). The Radiance of the King was described by Kwame Anthony Appiah as "one of the greatest of the African novels of the colonial period."

In 1956 Camara Laye returned to Africa, first to Dahomey, then the Gold Coast, and finally to newly independent Guinea, where he held several government posts. He left Guinea for Senegal in 1965 because of political issues, never returning to his home country. In 1966 Camara Laye's third novel, Dramouss (A Dream of Africa), was published. In 1978 his fourth and final work, Le Maître de la parole – Kouma Lafôlô Kouma (The Guardian of the Word), was published. The novel was based on the griot Babou Condé's performance of the Epic of Sundiata, about Sundiata Keita, the 13th-century founder of the Mali Empire.

=== Authorship controversy ===
Camara Laye's authorship of both L'Enfant noir and Le Regard du roi was questioned by literary scholar Adele King in her 2002 book Rereading Camara Laye. She claimed that he had considerable help in writing L'Enfant noir and did not write any part of Le Regard du roi. She suggests that Francis Soulié, a Belgian literary critic, was the true author of Le Regard du roi, and Laye was merely an intermediary. Scholar F. Abiola Irele, in an article called "In Search of Camara Laye", asserts that the claims are not "sufficiently grounded" to adequately justify that Laye did not author the mentioned work. Christopher L. Miller examined the controversy in his book Impostors: Literary Hoaxes and Cultural Authenticity; he found King's allegations were credible that Laye's involvement in authorship were minimal.

== Death ==
Camara Laye died in 1980 in Dakar of a kidney infection.

== Bibliography ==
- L’Enfant noir (1953). The Dark Child, trans. James Kirkup and Ernest Jones (Noonday Press, 1954; Collins, 1955). Later republished in the UK as The African Child (Fontana, 1959).
- Le Regard du roi (1954). The Radiance of the King, trans. James Kirkup (Collins, 1956).
- Dramouss (1966). A Dream of Africa, trans. James Kirkup (Collins, 1968).
- Le Maître de la parole (1978). The Guardian of the Word, trans. James Kirkup (Vintage, 1984).

== See also ==
- List of African writers by country
