= New Zealand String Quartet =

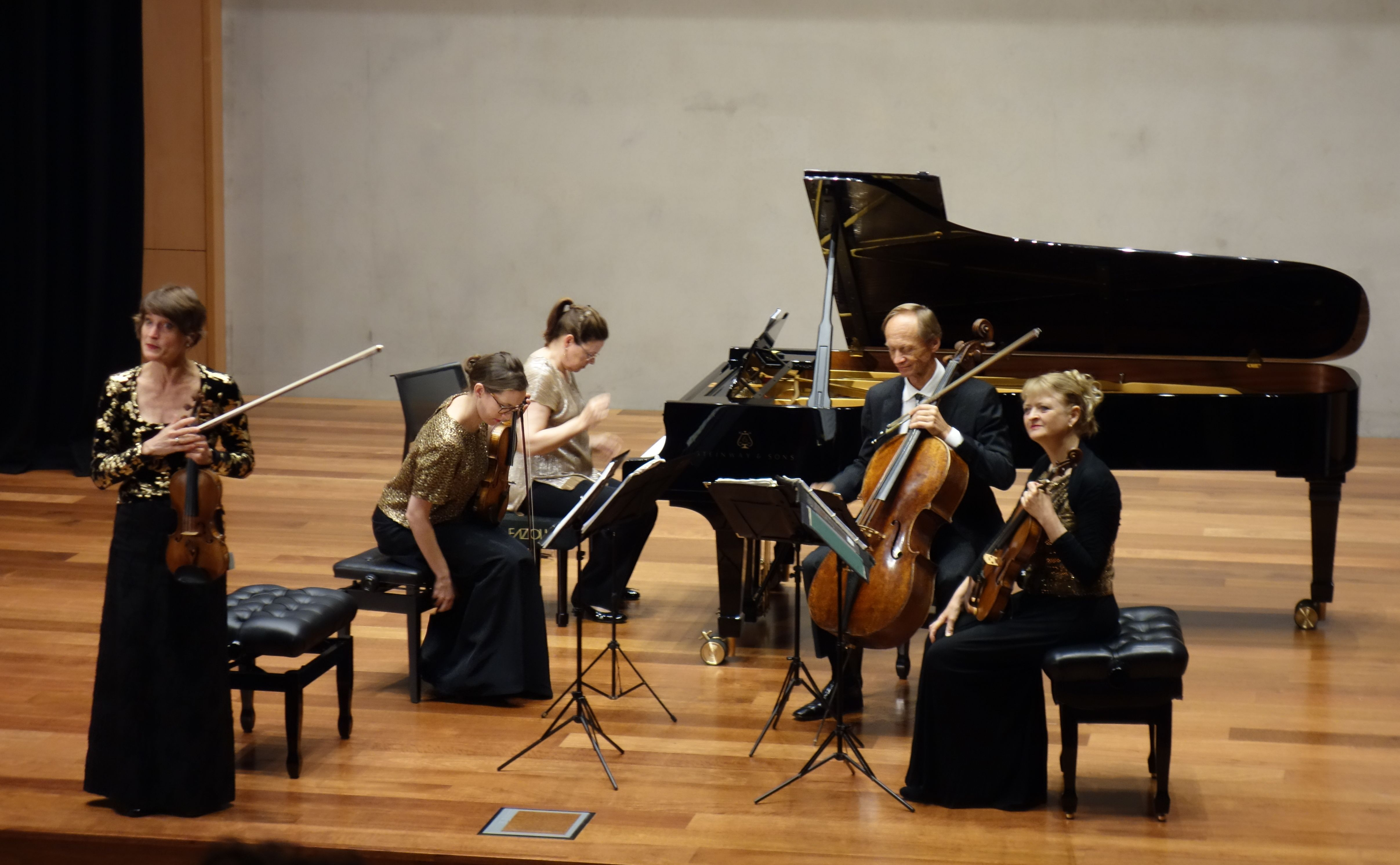
The New Zealand String Quartet performing with Kathryn Stott at The Piano in Christchurch

The New Zealand String Quartet (established 1987) is New Zealand's only full-time string quartet. The New Zealand String Quartet are resident artists at the biennial Adam Chamber Music Festival in Nelson, New Zealand, and have been the quartet-in-residence at Te Kōkī New Zealand School of Music at Victoria University of Wellington, since 1991.

== Members ==
As of March 2025, the current formation of musicians consists of Peter Clark (2nd violin) and Gillian Ansell (viola). Until mid-2025, guest artists will occupy the two vacancies. Applications to join the quartet closed on January 5, 2025.

Former members include Helene Pohl (1st violin, before 2025), Rolf Gjelsten (cello, before 2025), Monique Lapins (2nd violin, 2016-2024), Wilma Smith (1st violin, 1987–1993), Josephine Costantino (cello, 1987–1993) and Douglas Beilman (2nd violin, 1989–2015).

== Concerts ==
The NZSQ performs more than eighty concerts a year in New Zealand and international locations. Performances include international festivals such as the Festival of the Sound, Parry Sound, Ontario, Music Mountain Summer Chamber Music Festival in Lakeville, Connecticut, the Australian Festival of Chamber Music in Townsville, Queensland, and Quartetfest at Laurier University in Waterloo, Ontario. The 2026 season is called Storytellers.

== Recordings ==
The Quartet's discography includes a 3-CD series of Mendelssohn's string quartets for Naxos Records. Other recordings on Naxos include a CD featuring chamber works by Douglas Lilburn and a three-CD Brahms set. Other CDs have included works by a number of New Zealand composers and the complete string quartets of Béla Bartók for Atoll Records.

The quartet has also been recorded by CBC in Canada, ABC in Australia, Deutsche Welle (Germany) and Radio New Zealand.
