= International University Choral Festival =

Choral festival for university choirs

The International University Choral Festival was a non-competitive international festival for university choruses held in the United States. Five festivals were held between 1965 and 1982.

== History ==
The idea for an International University Choral Festival was conceived by Marshall Bartholomew, director of the Yale Glee Club, who had witnessed the power of singing during his work with prisoners of war during World War I. He passed his idea onto James Bjorge who, with the composer and president of the Lincoln Center William Schuman, arranged the first festival in September 1965. The purpose was to raise choral standards and to enhance international relations through singing. Choirs paid the cost of travel to get to the US but once there all expenses were covered by the Festival.

Twenty university choruses participated in the first festival in 1965 singing in New York at the Lincoln Center, the United Nations and Rockefeller Center and in Washington D.C. at the Washington Cathedral, followed by a concert tour of university campuses. Choirs were asked to include music from their country in their program, both indigenous and contemporary.

The second festival was held in 1969. The third in 1972 was attended by choirs from 16 countries: the Monteverdi Choir, University of Hamburg, Germany; Coral da Universidade de São Paulo, Brazil; Waseda University Glee Club, Japan; Academic Choir of Szczecin Technical University, Poland; Coro Universitario de San Juan, Argentina; Béla Bartók Choir, Eötvös Loránd University, Budapest, Hungary; Gandharva Choir, New Delhi, India; London Student Chorale, University of London, Great Britain; Amsterdam University Choir, Netherlands; Nyonza Singers, Kampala, Uganda; Choeur Madrigal de L'Université de Strasbourg, France; Ewha Womans University Glee Club, S. Korea; Copenhagen University Music Students Choir, Denmark; University of Auckland Festival Choir, New Zealand; Brno Academic Choir, Czechoslovakia; United States Universities Choir .

The programme for the massed choir concert in 1972, conducted by Robert Shaw, included: Declaration Chorale by William Schuman, In Ecclesiis by Orlando di Lasso, Rosa Amarela by Hector Villa-Lobos, Solov'yem Zalyetnym (The Fleeting Nightingale) by Alexander Alyabyev, the Japanese folksong Sohran Bushi (Fisherman's Work Song) arranged by Osamu Shimizu, spirituals My God is a Rock and Soon-ah will be done, Psalm 90 by Charles Ives, Hallelujah Chorus by Handel and Dona Nobis Pacem by J.S. Bach. Marshall Bartholomew conducted the choirs in Gaudeamus Igitur.

At the fourth festival in 1974 there were 12 foreign choirs and a specially formed United States Universities Chorus. As in previous festivals the choirs toured in the US between them visiting 100 universities, colleges and schools in 23 states before coming together to sing in the Kennedy Center and the Lincoln Center. Choir conductors also attended seminars in choral conducting.

The fifth festival in 1982 was called Choruses of the World. Choirs from ten countries performed sponsored by the Kennedy Center and the city of Philadelphia.

The festivals were directed by James R. Bjorge, Robert Shaw was the music director and the associate music directors were Thomas Hilbish and Willi Gohl. Matthew Bartholomew was Honorary Festival Director.

== Recordings and videos ==
- The Second International University Choral Festival (1969)
- The Third Lincoln Center International Choral Festival (1972)
- The Third International Choral Festival at the United Nations, 28 April 1972
- The Fourth Lincoln Center International Choral Festival (1974)
