= Gareth Farr =

New Zealand composer, performer and percussionist

Gareth Farr ONZM
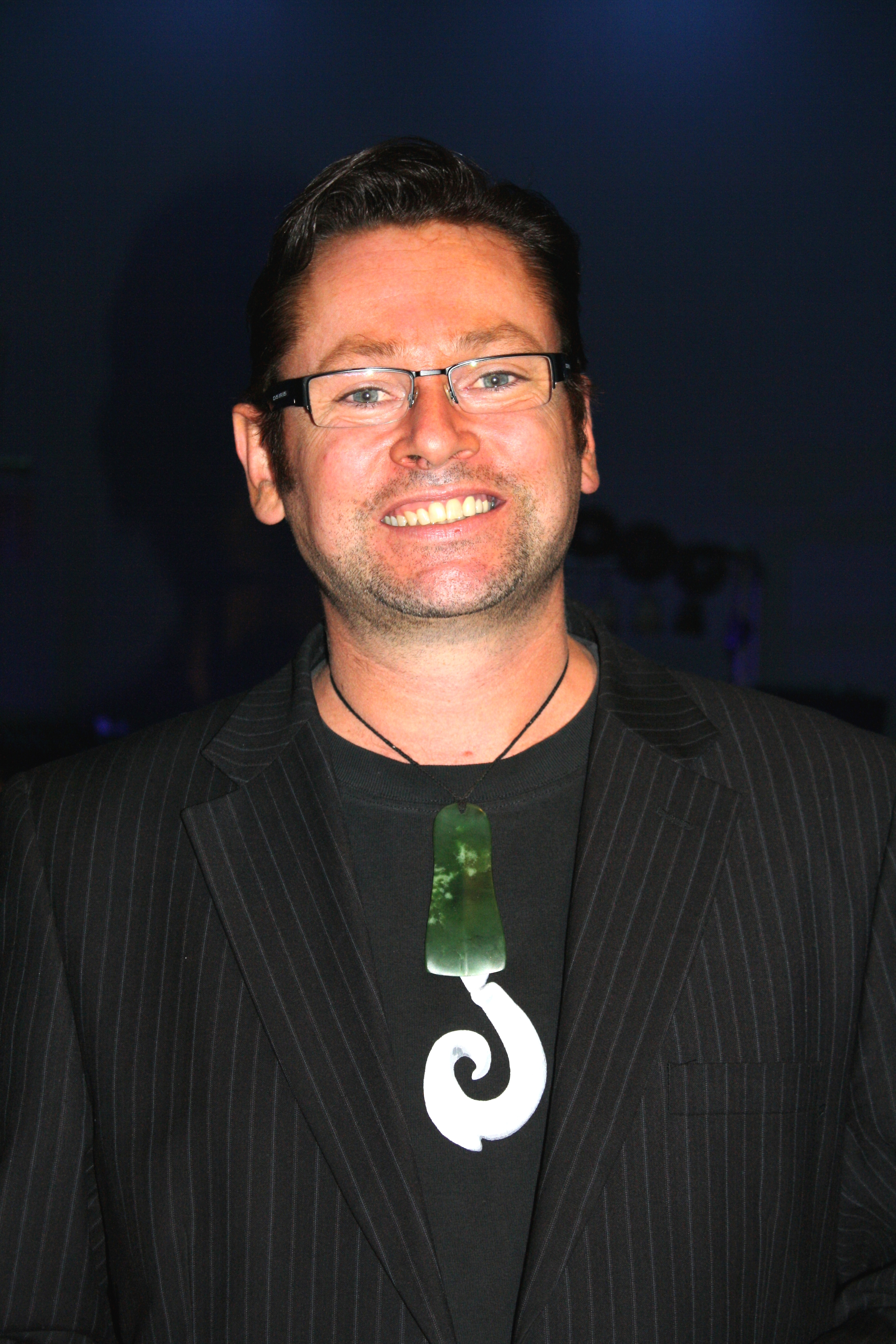
- Farr in 2011
- Born: 29 February 1968 (age 58); Wellington, New Zealand
- Other name: Lilith LaCroix
- Education: University of Auckland; Victoria University of Wellington; Eastman School of Music
- Occupations: Composer; Percussionist; Drag artist

Gareth Vincent Farr ONZM (born 29 February 1968) is a New Zealand composer and percussionist. He has released a number of classical CDs and composed a number of works performed by the New Zealand Symphony Orchestra (NZSO) and Royal New Zealand Ballet. He has also performed in drag under the name Lilith LaCroix in a show called Drumdrag and has also released a CD under that name.

== Early life and education ==
Farr was born in Wellington in 1968. He began his studies at the University of Auckland in composition, orchestration and electronic music. While studying there, he performed as a member of the Auckland Philharmonia Orchestra (APO) and the Karlheinz Company. Farr was always available as a performer to play new works by other composers. Returning to Wellington in 1988 for further study at Victoria University of Wellington, he gained note for his compositions, at this time becoming increasingly excited with exploring the Indonesian gamelan. He played percussion frequently with the NZSO before going to the Eastman School of Music in Rochester, New York for advanced study.

== Career ==
Farr became the composer in residence with Chamber Music New Zealand at 25, the youngest person to hold that post. In 1994, he had four works commissioned for the 1994 International Festival of the Arts including Lilith's Dream of Ecstasy and works for flautist Alexa Still and pianist Michael Houstoun as well as a ballet. In 1996, he signed to music publisher Promethean Editions becoming a founding house composer.

His work From the Depths Sound the Great Sea Gongs was specially commissioned for the 50th anniversary of the NZSO. It was one of his works that has been influenced by gamelan. He has used gamelan instruments or composed for non-gamelan instruments to be played in a gamelan-like way in other compositions such as Siteran (1990) for Javanese gamelan and harp, Kebyar Moncar (1993) for Victoria's gamelan, Tabuh Pacific (1995) for Balinese gamelan and orchestra, and piano pieces such as Sepuluh Jari (1996) and Jangan Lupa (2003), written for the Indonesian pianist Ananda Sukarlan .

Farr's piece for percussion ensemble Volume Pig (1992) was recorded by the group Strike in 2002. Farr also wrote an orchestral piece Te Papa for the opening of Te Papa, the National Museum of New Zealand, in 1998.

In 2000, the NZSO performed his percussion concerto Hikoi with Evelyn Glennie at the Sydney Olympics. He has released four CDs of his work on the Trust label with the fifth, Ruaumoko released in early 2006. Farr furthered New Zealand gamelan in 2003 purchasing a Balinese Gong Kebyar that is housed at the New Zealand School of Music.

In 2005, he provided the music for Vula staged during the Christchurch Arts Festival prior to the world debut of his Triple Concerto performed by the New Zealand Trio and Christchurch Symphony Orchestra. During 2006, New Zealand premieres of Farr's music included Funambulistic Strains for orchestra and trombone, performed by David Bremner and the NZSO, The Wedding for the Royal New Zealand Ballet, and TROY the Musical with librettist Paul Jenden.

In December 2005 Farr visited Antarctica as part of Antarctica New Zealand's artist programme, Artists to Antarctica. The result of the two-week residency was Terra Incognita, a piece for baritone singer and orchestra inspired by the ill-fated last expedition of Robert Falcon Scott. The work was performed in 2008 by London-based New Zealand singer Paul Whelan and the NZSO.

In 2008, Gareth was appointed Composer in Residence of the APO. Farr composed a memorial piece for the Christchurch earthquake, Nor'West Arch, first performed on 25 September 2011. The title makes reference to a particular Christchurch weather pattern, but is also that part of the ChristChurch Cathedral that received most damage in the earthquake. Dean Peter Beck was part of the performance, reading out an introduction and a reflection. The concert was one of the highlights of the 2011 Christchurch Arts Festival.

In 2015, Relict Furies by Farr and Paul Horan had its premiere at the Edinburgh International Festival. Described as "a masterful portrayal of grief and desolation and one of the most moving tributes to those who lived through World War I", it also played as part of the New Zealand Festival in March 2016.

In 2017, The Bone Feeder played as part of the Auckland Festival from 23 to 26 March. A new opera, it was scored by Farr and written by poet and playwright Renee Liang, and explored the mysteries, traumas and gifts of migration, home and belonging. Directed by Sara Brodie and conducted by Peter Scholes, the opera takes Farr's unique combination of Western, Māori and Chinese instruments to create sweeping beautiful and playful music sung in English, Māori and Cantonese.

Also in 2017, Farr worked on another NZSO commission, a substantial cello concerto titled Chemin des Dames, with a personal World War I connection. "All three of my great-grandmother's elder brothers, beautiful young boys, were killed within a year in separate battles in northern France and Belgium". The concerto premiered in New Zealand and France by cellist Sébastien Hurtaud, recognising a shared wartime history.

Alongside Jack Body, Gillian Whitehead and John Psathas, Farr is one of the noted New Zealand composers.

== Lilith LaCroix ==
Gareth Farr also performs in drag as Lilith LaCroix in cabaret shows. Since 1997, the cabaret Drumdrag features Lilith playing the drums and Farr has recorded a CD released under her name. LaCroix also made a music video to promote the album. Advertisers have also asked LaCroix to appear in advertisements.

Farr promotes himself as an entertainer as well as a composer:

I would, perhaps, be criticised for being too entertaining by some composers, but I don't know what's wrong with that because that is why I write music—I'm an entertainer. That's a dirty word in the classical department, but I don't care. I've even got it on my business card – composer/entertainer – because, hey, let's face it, that's what I do.

== Honours ==
In the 2006 Queen's Birthday Honours, Farr was appointed an Officer of the New Zealand Order of Merit, for services to music and entertainment. In 2021 German malacologists named a newly-described species of tiny freshwater snail Obtusopyrgus farri, after Farr.

== Selected works ==
- Lilith's Dream of Ecstasy (1995)
- From the Depths Sound the Great Sea Gongs (1996)
- Te Papa (1998)
- Hikoi (1999)
- Jangan Lupa (2004 for piano solo, written for the Indonesian pianist and composer Ananda Sukarlan)
- Vula Canon (2004)
- Triple Concerto (2005)
- Funambulistic Strains (2006)
- Terra Incognita (2008)
- The Nor'west Arch (2011)
- Relict Furies (2008)
- The Bone Feeder (2017)
- Concerto for Cello and Orchestra Chemin des Dames (2017)
- Ngā Hihi o Matariki (2021)
