= John Rimmer (composer) =

New Zealand composer

John Rimmer (born 5 February 1939) is a New Zealand composer.

== Biography ==
John Francis Rimmer was born in Auckland. He earned a Bachelor of Arts degree in 1961 from the University of New Zealand in 1961, a Master of Arts in 1963 from the University of Auckland with Ronald Tremain, where he also completed post-graduate studies in musicology. He continued his studies, earning a Doctor of Music degree in 1972 from the University of Toronto in electronic music with Gustav Ciamaga and in composition with John Weinzweig.

After completing his education, Rimmer worked as a lecturer at North Shores Teachers College in Auckland from 1970 to 1974 and taught at the University of Auckland from 1974 to 1999, where he was awarded a chair in music in 1995. He was awarded the Mozart Fellowship and served as composer-in-residence at the University of Otago in 1972, and composer-in-residence to the Auckland Philharmonia in 2002–03. Rimmer founded the electronic music studio at the University of Auckland in 1976 and the Karlheinz Company in 1978. His works have been performed internationally in Asia, Australia, New Zealand, Europe and North America.

Rimmer and his wife Helen reside in Tapu Bay, Kaiteretere, New Zealand. Notable students include Susan Frykberg and Dorothy Ker.

== Honors and awards ==
Rimmer received a number of prizes and awards in recognition of his contributions to music, including:

- Philip Neil Memorial Prize, University of Otago in Dunedin, 1971, for Composition 2
- Philip Neil Memorial Prize, University of Otago in Dunedin, 2003, for Bowed Insights
- First Prize in the International Horn competition in the US, 1983, for De Aestibus Rerum
- Prix de la Confédération Internationale de la Musique Électroacoustique de Bourges, 1986, for Fleeting Images

== Works ==
Rimmer composes for stage, orchestra, chamber, choral, piano, and electroacoustic performances. His compositions have been recorded and are available on media. Selected works include:

- At the Appointed Time, for orchestra
- A dialogue of opposites, for cello solo
- Au concerto, for bass clarinet and ensemble
- Bowed Insights, for string quartet
- Beyond the saying, electronic music
- Concerto for viola and orchestra (1980)
- Composition 2, for wind quintet and electronic sounds
- December Nights, for chamber orchestra
- De Aestibus Rerum, for chamber quintet
- Europa concerto, for brass band and orchestra
- Fleeting Images, electroacoustic work
- Mahurangi – Place of Importance for solo viola (1992)
