= Samara Joy discography =

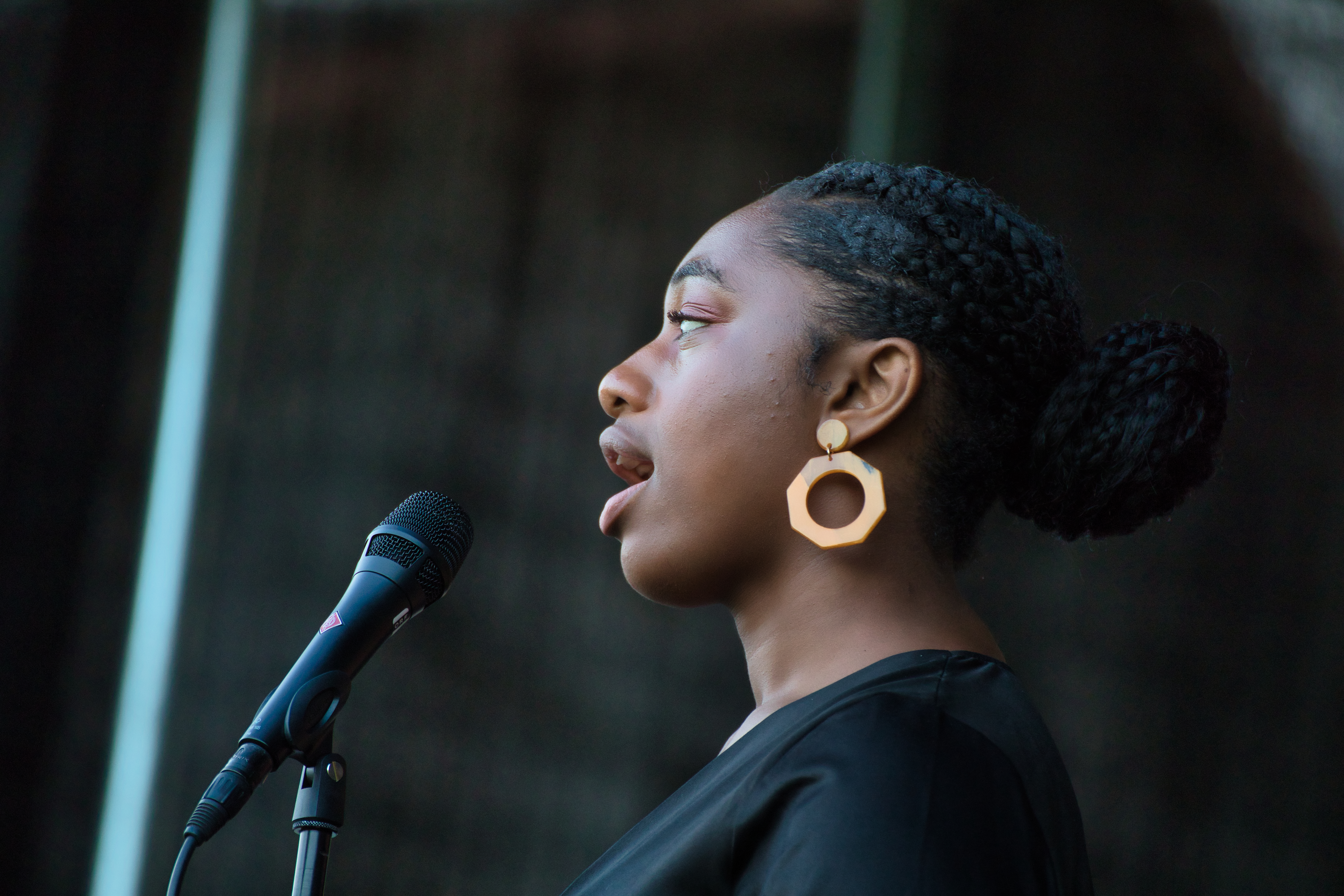
- Samara Joy at a jazz festival, 2022.
- Studio albums: 3
- EPs: 1
- Singles: 16
- Other album appearances: 1

The discography of American singer Samara Joy contains three studio albums, one extended play (EP), 16 singles and one album appearance. Joy's debut studio album was released in July 2021 and was self-titled. The 12-track collection was issued by Whirlwind Recordings and reached number 94 on Japan's Billboard Hot Albums chart. Three singles were issued from the disc, including a cover of "Stardust". Her second album was released in September 2022 by Verve Records and was titled Linger Awhile. The disc reached number 158 on the US Billboard 200 and number one on the US Top Jazz Albums chart in 2023. In October 2023, Verve issued Joy's debut EP titled A Joyful Holiday.

Joy grew up completely immersed in music. Her grandparents created the renowned Savettes gospel choir, and her father sang and played bass on tour with Andraé Crouch. So even before she realized it, jazz was already in her blood, shaped first and foremost by a deep gospel influence. Her rising presence on major TV networks and her popularity on TikTok have made her a standout for young listeners, giving her a platform to introduce them to the richness of older jazz and keep its legacy alive for a new generation, while also leading people to compare her at a young age to some of the most influential figures in the genre, like Ella Fitzgerald and Sarah Vaughan highlighting just how powerfully she is carrying its legacy forward.

A total of eight singles by Joy were digitally-issued in 2023. Among them were covers of "Guess Who I Saw Today" (her second to feature Gerald Clayton) and "Lush Life". Joy also contributed to the soundtrack of Shirley with the 2023 single, "Why I'm Here". Additionally, she was featured on three singles between 2020 and 2024, among them being a cover of "Summertime" (featuring Barbara Douglas and Ayanna Fowler). Her third studio album was released in October 2024 by Verve titled Portrait. The disc was Joy's second to make the US jazz albums chart, reaching the top five.

== Albums ==
=== Studio albums ===
List of albums, with selected chart positions and sales, showing other relevant details
| Title | Album details | Peak chart positions | | | | |
| Title | Album details | US | US Jazz | JPN Hot | SCO | SWI |
|---|---|---|---|---|---|---|
| Samara Joy | Released: July 9, 2021; Label: Whirlwind; Format: CD, vinyl LP, digital | — | — | 94 | — | — |
| Linger Awhile | Released: September 16, 2022; Label: Verve; Formats: CD, LP, digital | 158 | 1 | — | 78 | 37 |
| Portrait | Released: October 11, 2024; Label: Verve; Formats: CD, LP, digital | — | 5 | — | — | — |
"—" denotes items which did not chart in that country.

== Extended plays ==
List of extended plays, showing all relevant details
| Title | Album details |
|---|---|
| A Joyful Holiday | Released: October 27, 2023; Label: Verve; Formats: CD, LP, digital |

== Compilations ==
List of compilations, showing all relevant details
| Title | Album details |
|---|---|
| Linger Awhile Longer | Released: June 16, 2023; Label: Verve; Formats: CD, LP, digital |

== Singles ==
=== As lead artist ===
List of lead singles, showing title, year released and album name
| Title | Year | Album | Ref. |
|---|---|---|---|
| "The Trouble with Me Is You" | 2021 | Samara Joy | |
| "Stardust" | 2021 | Samara Joy | |
| "Jim" | 2021 | Samara Joy | |
| "Warm in December (Edit)" | 2022 | A Joyful Holiday | |
| "O Holy Night" (featuring The McLendon Family) | 2022 | —N/a | |
| "Can't Get Out of This Mood" | 2023 | Linger Awhile Longer | |
| "Sweet Pumpkin" (featuring Gerald Clayton) | 2023 | Linger Awhile Longer | |
| "Guess Who I Saw Today" (duo version featuring Gerald Clayton) | 2023 | Linger Awhile Longer | |
| "I Miss You So" | 2023 | Linger Awhile Longer | |
| "Lush Life" | 2023 | —N/a | |
| "Someone Like You" | 2023 | —N/a | |
| "Tight" | 2023 | —N/a | |
| "Why I'm Here" | 2024 | Shirley (soundtrack) | |
| "Flor de Lis (Upside Down)" | 2025 | —N/a | |
| "Three Little Words" | 2025 | —N/a | |

=== As a featured artist ===
List of featured singles, showing title, year released and album name
| Title | Year | Album | Ref. |
|---|---|---|---|
| "So Much Joy" (Ruben Fox featuring Samara Joy, Vuyo Sotashe and Shenel Johns) | 2020 | Introducing...Ruben Fox | |
| "Summertime" (featuring Barbara Douglas, Samara Joy and Ayanna Fowler) | 2021 | —N/a | |
| "Remember" (Tank and the Bangas featuring Samara Joy and Robert Glasper) | 2024 | The Heart, the Mind, the Soul | |
| "Old Folks" (Christian McBride featuring Samara Joy) | 2025 | Without Further Ado, Vol 1 | |

== Other album appearances ==
List of non-single guest appearances, with other performing artists, showing year released and album name
| Title | Year | Other artist(s) | Album | Ref. |
|---|---|---|---|---|
| "Two Hearts (Lawns)" | 2022 | Terri Lyne Carrington | New Standards, Vol. 1 | |
| "What Are You Doing New Year's Eve?" | 2023 | Gregory Porter | Christmas Wish | |
