= Matt Pierson =

American music producer (born 1962)

- Born: March 10, 1962 (age 64); Detroit, Michigan
- Website: mattpierson.net

Matt Pierson is an American executive, manager, and Grammy-winning music producer known for producing many noted jazz artists beginning in the late 1980s.

He led the marketing and A&R departments at Blue Note Records and served as Executive VP/GM of Warner Bros. Records' jazz division, which he headed for more than 10 years. Since 2004, he has been an independent producer, manager, and consultant.

Pierson's recordings have received Grammy nominations and wins and include Billboard #1 albums and singles.. His producer discography includes recordings by Brad Mehldau, Joshua Redman, Pat Metheny, k.d. lang, Bob James, Kirk Whalum, Jane Monheit, Wallace Roney, Milt Jackson, Milton Nascimento, Robert Randolph, Samara Joy, and Laura Benanti.

== Education and career as musician: 1970s–1980s ==
Matt Pierson's father, Jack Pierson, a noted Michigan bandleader and educator, was one of his music teachers. After earning a bachelor's degree in Studio Music and Jazz at the University of Miami, Matt played trumpet professionally with Miami Sound Machine, Bob James, Julio Iglesias, salsa bands, and other acts, and on commercial recording sessions.

== Blue Note Records: 1988–1992 ==
In 1988 he moved to New York City and was hired as Promotion Assistant at Blue Note Records. Mentored by Bruce Lundvall and Michael Cuscuna, he began doing A&R work and producing recordings, beginning with Bobby Watson & Horizon, Benny Green, Rick Margitza, Bob Belden and others. He was involved in signing John Scofield, Joe Lovano, and Rachelle Ferrell to the label, and handled the release of Blue Note reissues. Eventually he rose to the position of Director of Marketing and A&R.

== Warner Bros. Records: 1992–2004 ==
In 1992 Warner Bros. Records hired him as Director of A&R, Jazz & Progressive Music. In 1995, he was promoted to Senior Vice President for Jazz.

At Warner he signed and produced Kenny Garrett, Joshua Redman, Brad Mehldau, Kevin Mahogany, Larry Goldings, Mark Turner, and others, and oversaw a roster that included Bob James, Joe Sample, Fourplay, Michael Franks, Earl Klugh, George Benson, Al Jarreau, George Duke, and others.

Warner Jazz grew substantially under Pierson's leadership in the early 1990s, especially in mainstream jazz, with the signing of many prominent artists. Pierson signed Rick Braun, Larry Carlton, Jonathan Butler, Gabriela Anders, John Stoddart, Pat Metheny, and Kirk Whalum and Norman Brown.

At Warner he also produced a series of compilations and reissues, including packages featuring artists such as Duke Ellington, George Benson, Bill Evans, David Sanborn, and Jaco Pastorius.

In January 1999, he was promoted to Executive Vice President/General Manager–Jazz.

== Movie soundtracks and cast albums ==
In the late 1990s Pierson worked with Clint Eastwood on Eastwood's Maspaso Records imprint, serving as Music Supervisor and producing the soundtracks to Midnight in the Garden of Good and Evil and Space Cowboys. He also produced the soundtrack to the Louis Malle film Vanya on 42nd Street and the original cast album of 50 SHADES! THE MUSICAL.

== Independent producer and manager: 2004–present ==
After leaving Warner in 2004, Pierson became an independent producer and consultant, consulting for clients including Rhino, Apple, and PledgeMusic.

In 2006 he launched the Mosaic Contemporary imprint for Mosaic Records, producing a series of compilations and reissues.

In 2012, Pierson produced the 2-CD Over the Moon: The Broadway Lullaby Project, which featured Audra McDonald, Donna Murphy, Kelli O'Hara, Vanessa Williams, Anika Noni Rose, Brian D’Arcy James, Sutton Foster and others, with music by Stephen Sondheim, Sammy Cahn, Stephen Schwartz, Tony Kushner, and others.

From 2015–2020 he served as A&R Consultant for Sony Masterworks, where he signed and produced Robert Randolph's Grammy-nominated Got Soul album and recordings by Bria Skonberg, New Masters, and Laura Benanti.

His productions since 2005 include Samara Joy's Grammy-winning recordings, Kirk Whalum’s Babyface Songbook, Jane Monheit’s The Lovers, The Dreamers, and Me, Taylor Eigsti’s Daylight at Midnight, Becca Stevens Band’s Weightless, Sophie Milman’s In the Moonlight, James Maddock’s Another Life, Kirk Whalum's Grammy nominated Everything is Everything: The Music of Donny Hathaway, and Svetlana's album Night at the Movies which debuted at #1 on the US Billboard Traditional Jazz Album Chart in 2019. He produced two 2020 albums by Dayna Stephens, Right Now! Live at the Village Vanguard and Liberty.

Serving as a judge at the Sarah Vaughan International Jazz Vocal Competition in 2019 Pierson met the winner, Samara Joy. After producing her debut recording, he took on management responsibilities. In 2022, he produced her Verve debut recording Linger Awhile, which netted the Best Jazz Vocal Album award at the 2023 Grammy Awards, and earned Joy the Best New Artist award, only the second jazz artist to win the award. Pierson produced Samara Joy's EP A Joyful Holiday which earned Joy two Grammys in 2025: for Best Jazz Vocal Album, and for Best Jazz Performance for her rendition of "Twinkle Twinkle Little Me" featuring Sullivan Fortner.

His management clients include vocalists Stella Cole and Lucía and trumpeter/vocalist Bria Skonberg.

== Selected producer discography ==
Artist	Recording	Year	Label
Dida Pelled	I Wish You Would	2026	La Reserve
Stella Cole	It's Magic	2025	Decca Records
Lucía	Lucía	2025	La Reserve
Bria Skonberg	What It Means	2024	Cellar Music
Stella Cole	Stella Cole	2024	La Reserve
Samara Joy	A Joyful Holiday	2023	Verve
Samara Joy	Linger Awhile	2022	Verve
Pasquale Grasso	Be-Bop!	2022	Sony Masterworks
Pasquale Grasso	Pasquale Plays Duke	2021	Sony Masterworks
Samara Joy	Samara Joy	2021	Whirlwind
Laura Benanti	Go Slow	2020	Sony Masterworks
Bria Skonberg	With a Twist	2017	Sony Masterworks
Robert Randolph and the Family Band	Got Soul	2017	Sony Masterworks
Becca Stevens Band	Weightless	2010	Sunnyside
Kirk Whalum	Everything Is Everything	2010	Mack Ave.
Jane Monheit	The Lovers, the Dreamers, and Me	2008	Concord
Kirk Whalum	Babyface Songbook	2005	Rendezvous
Brad Mehldau	Anything Goes	2004	Warner Bros.
Joshua Redman	Elastic	2002	Warner Bros.
BWB	Groovin'	2002	Warner Bros.
Brad Mehldau	Progression: The Art of the Trio, Vol. 5	2001	Warner Bros.
Brad Mehldau	Art of the Trio 4: Back at the Vanguard	1999	Warner Bros.
Fourplay	Snowbound	1999	Warner Bros.
Mark Turner	In This World	1998	Warner Bros.
Brad Mehldau	Songs: The Art of the Trio Volume Three	1998	Warner Bros.
Brad Mehldau	Live at the Village Vanguard: The Art of the Trio Volume Two	1998	Warner Bros.
Kevin Mahogany	My Romance	1998	Warner Bros.
Various Artists (Soundtrack)	Midnight in the Garden of Good and Evil	1997	Malpaso
Brad Mehldau	The Art of the Trio Volume One	1997	Warner Bros.
Wallace Roney	Village	1997	Warner Bros.
Joshua Redman	Freedom in the Groove	1996	Warner Bros.
Kenny Garrett	Pursuance: The Music of John Coltrane	1996	Warner Bros.
Various Artists	Warner Jams, Vol. 1	1995	Warner Bros.
Joshua Redman	Spirit of the Moment – Live at the Village Vanguard	1995	Warner Bros.
Brad Mehldau	Introducing Brad Mehldau	1995	Warner Bros.
Bob James	Straight Up	1995	Warner Bros.
Michael Franks	Abandoned Garden	1995	Warner Bros.
Wallace Roney	Mistérios	1994	Warner Bros.
Joshua Redman	MoodSwing	1994	Warner Bros.
Joshua Redman	Wish	1993	Warner Bros.
Joshua Redman	Joshua Redman	1993	Warner Bros.
Milton Nascimento	Angelus	1993	Warner Bros.
Benny Green Trio	Testifyin'!: Live at the Village Vanguard	1992	Blue Note

== See also ==
Category:Albums_produced_by_Matt_Pierson
