= Stella Cole =

American singer (born 1999)

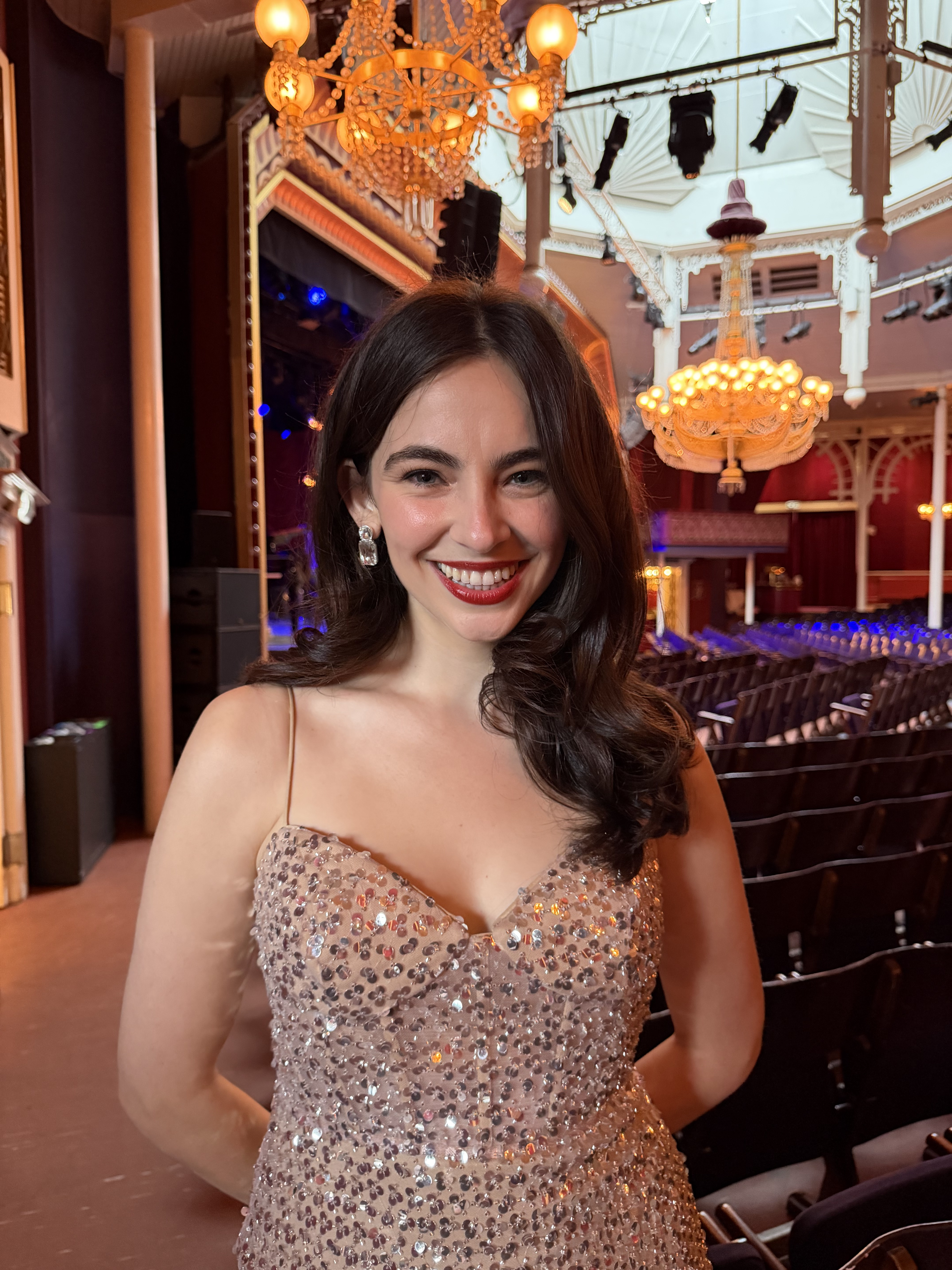
- Stella Cole at Glassalen (2026)

Background information
- Born: Stella Katherine Cole; January 13, 1999 (age 27); Springfield, Illinois, U.S.
- Genres: Jazz pop; traditional pop; classical
- Occupation: Singer-songwriter
- Years active: 2020–present
- Labels: La Reserve Records; Decca Records
- Website: www.stellacole.net

Stella Katherine Cole (born 13 January 1999) is an American singer known for her interpretations of jazz standards and songs from the Great American Songbook. Her expanding international audience includes more than 1.7 million social media followers and tens of millions of video views across digital platforms. Citing Judy Garland as a major influence, Cole initially gained significant popularity through social media platforms before establishing herself as a prominent live performer and recording artist in the New York City jazz scene.

== Early life and education ==
Cole was born and raised in Springfield, Illinois. Her fascination with music began at the age of three after watching The Wizard of Oz. This sparked a lifelong passion for movie musicals and their iconic stars, particularly Judy Garland and Barbra Streisand, who remain her biggest inspirations. She attended Northwestern University, where she graduated in 2021 with a degree in theatre and international relations. According to Cole, her time at university helped her to hone her vocal skills and deepen her understanding of the music that she loved.

== Career ==
During the COVID-19 pandemic, while at home, Cole began posting videos of herself singing on TikTok. An impromptu clip of "Over the Rainbow" went viral, and she quickly amassed a large following. Her rendition of Stephen Sondheim's "Everybody Says Don't" also went viral. After graduating, Cole moved to New York City and immersed herself in the local jazz community. She began performing at various clubs and restaurants, building her repertoire and reputation. She has since performed at venues like Birdland Jazz Club, Dizzy's Club at Jazz at Lincoln Center, and the Café Carlyle. Her online fame led to collaborations with major artists and groups. She has toured with Postmodern Jukebox across the United States, Australia, and New Zealand. Her 2023 collaboration with the group on a cover of Miley Cyrus's "Flowers" was widely acclaimed, racking up more than 6 million views. Cole released her self-titled debut album that year, produced by Matt Pierson. The album features a mix of well-known standards and lesser-known songs, with arrangements by Grammy-winner Alan Broadbent.

In March 2026, Cole performed with her quartet over four nights at the Xiqu Centre, Hong Kong. In a glowing review, the South China Morning Post wrote:

Smooth, playful, dramatic and teasing, the Stella Cole Quartet gave its Xiqu Centre audience a night of all-American nostalgic glamour. Wit and warmth abounded in the Stella Cole Quartet’s run of four performances at Hong Kong’s Xiqu Centre. A baker’s dozen of jazz standards and classic film favourites delivered over an hour proved an ideal format – well paced and polished, without a moment of slack. Meanwhile, the retro stylings of the bijoux Tea House Theatre mirrored Cole’s profile as a performer: an old soul in youthful form.

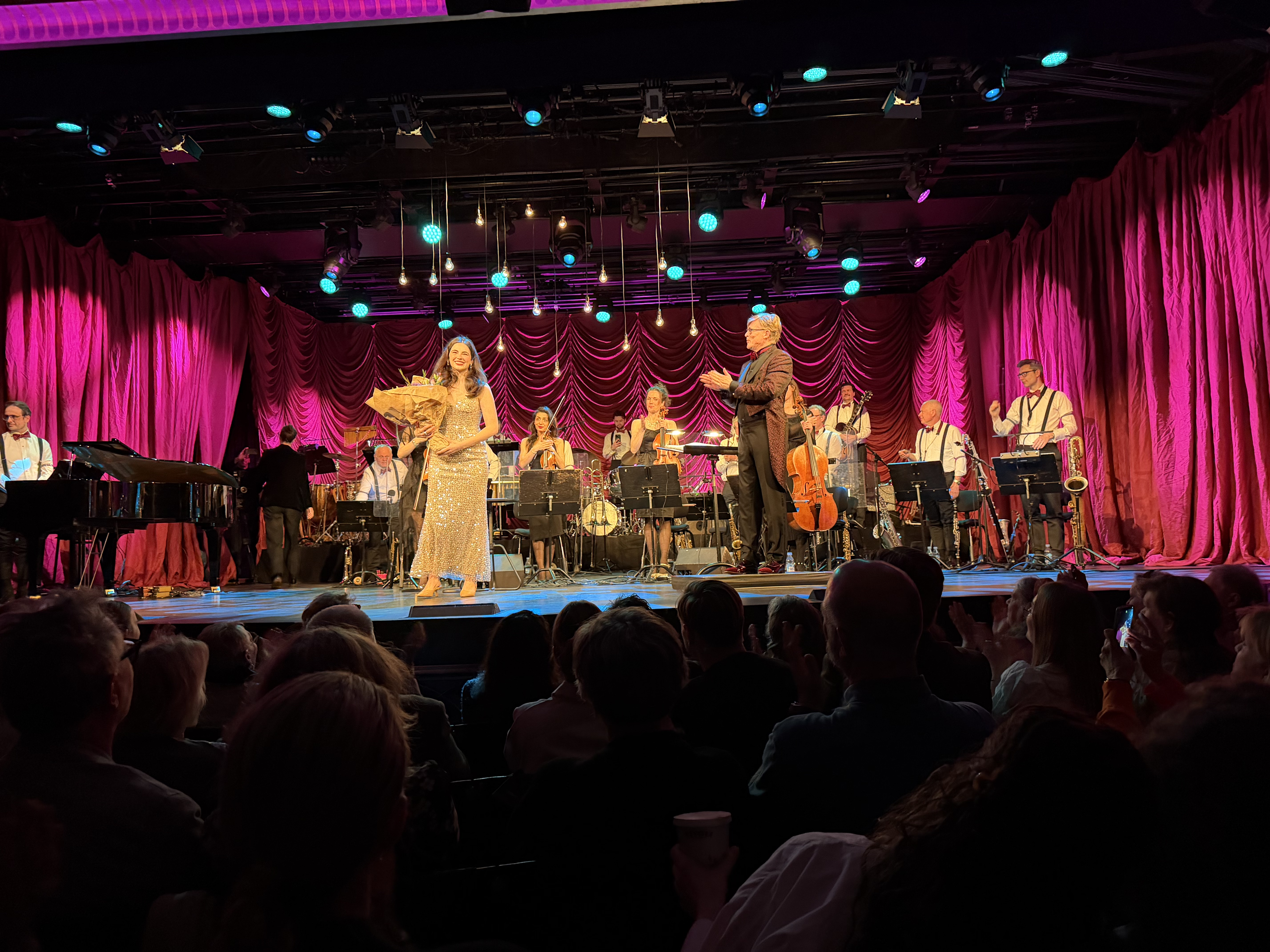
Conductor Mikkel Rønnow joins audience in applauding Stella Cole

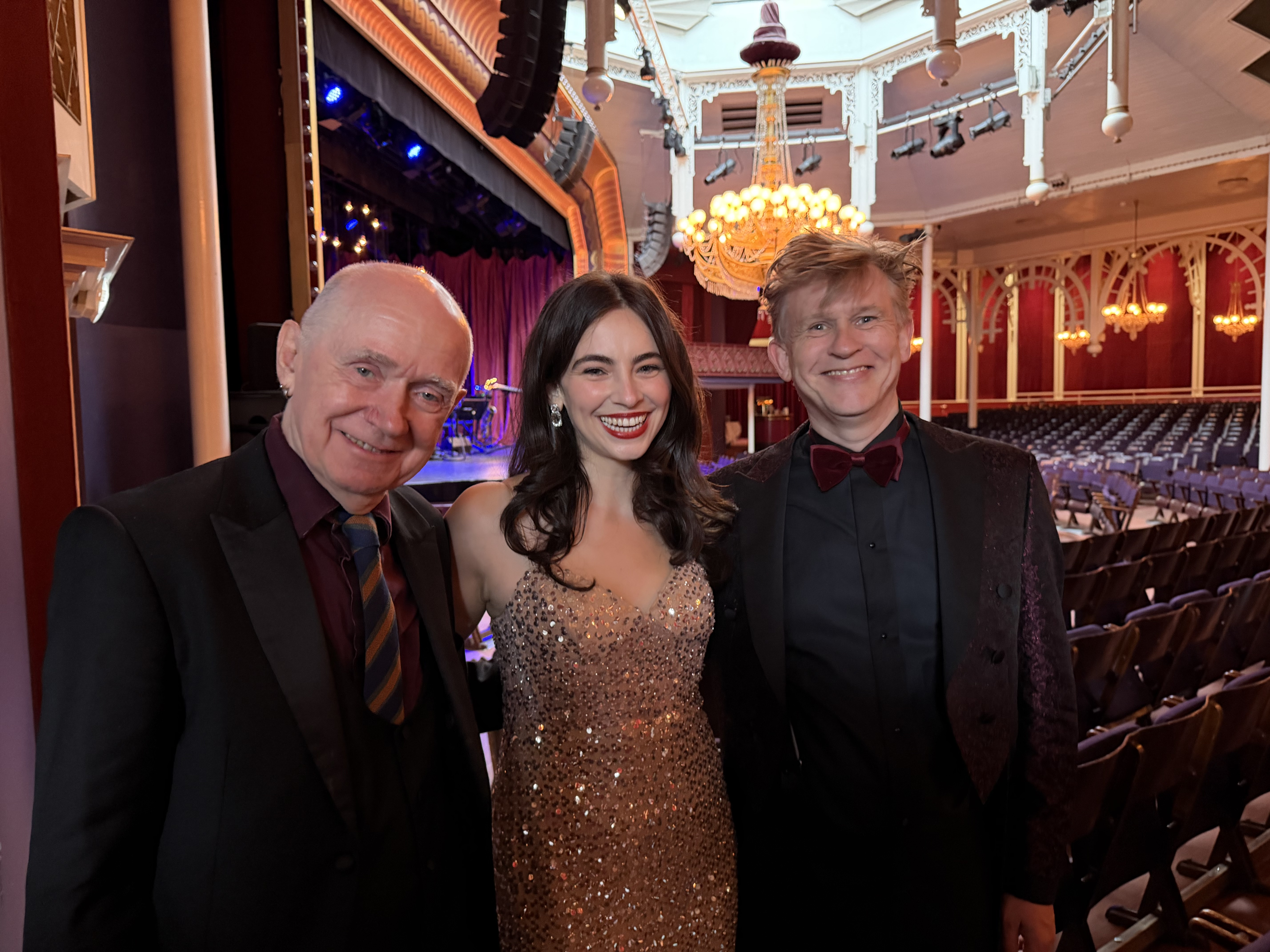
From left: arranger Derek Williams, Stella Cole, conductor Mikkel Rønnow

Glass Hall (Tivoli Gardens) concert 19 April 2026

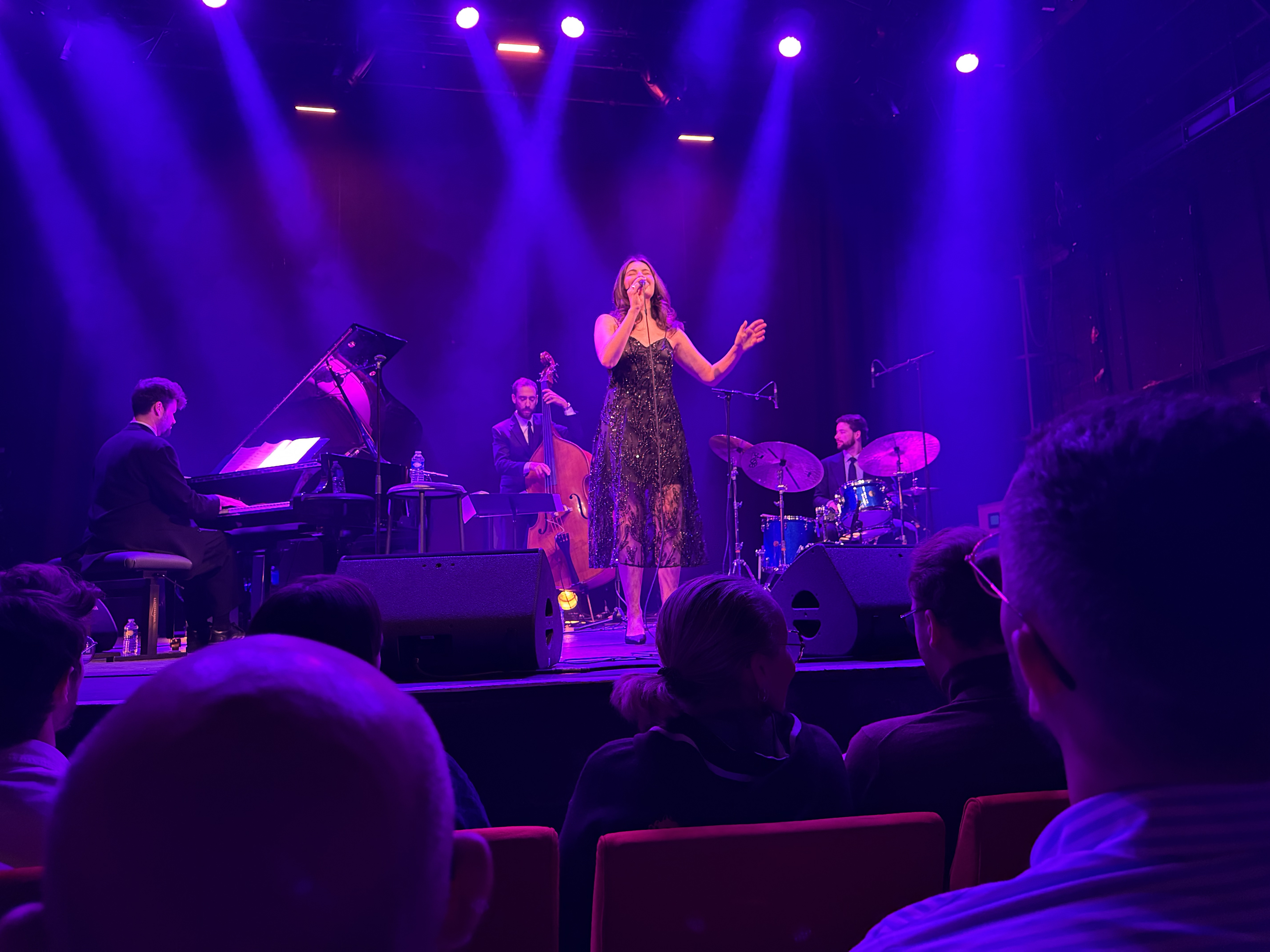
Cole on stage at La Cigale (Paris) in 2025

On 19 April 2026, Cole performed with Danish conductor Mikkel Rønnow and his orchestra in two concerts at the Glass Hall (Tivoli Gardens) Theatre ("Glassalen"), that featured arrangements by Alan Broadbent and Jesper Riis, with two newly commissioned arrangements of the Judy Garland classics "The Man That Got Away" and "Almost Like Being in Love" by Scottish composer Derek Williams based on those he originally scored for Caroline O'Connor (actress) at the Sydney Opera House. The concerts played to capacity audiences, who gave Cole and Rønnow spontaneous standing ovations, and received favourable reviews, with GAFFA magazine describing Cole as "an absolutely worthy heir to names like Doris Day and Judy Garland."

On October 20, 2026, Cole made her Broadway debut replacing Dez Duron as fictional jazz singer Gil Brentley in the Broadway production of Maybe Happy Ending for four weeks. On 28 March 2027, during her live tour of the UK, Cole will star in a concert performance at the Adelphi Theatre, London, with Rønnow as conductor and Broadbent, Riis and Williams retained to score new arrangements.

== Artistry ==
Cole performs jazz standards, many of which are from the Great American Songbook.

== Discography ==
=== Albums ===
- Stella Cole (2023)
- Snow! (2024)
- It's Magic (2025)
- Live at Café Carlyle (2026)

=== Singles ===
- "Next Christmas" (2022)
- "Flowers" (with Postmodern Jukebox) (2023)
- "Uptown Girl" (with Postmodern Jukebox) (2023)
- "Christmas Dreaming" (2023)
- "Moon River" (2024)
- "P.S. I Love You" (2024)
- "Till There Was You" (2025)
- "Say It" (2025)
- "Merry Christmas, Darling" (2025)
