= Mikkel Rønnow =

Danish musical director, conductor and theatrical producer (born 1974)

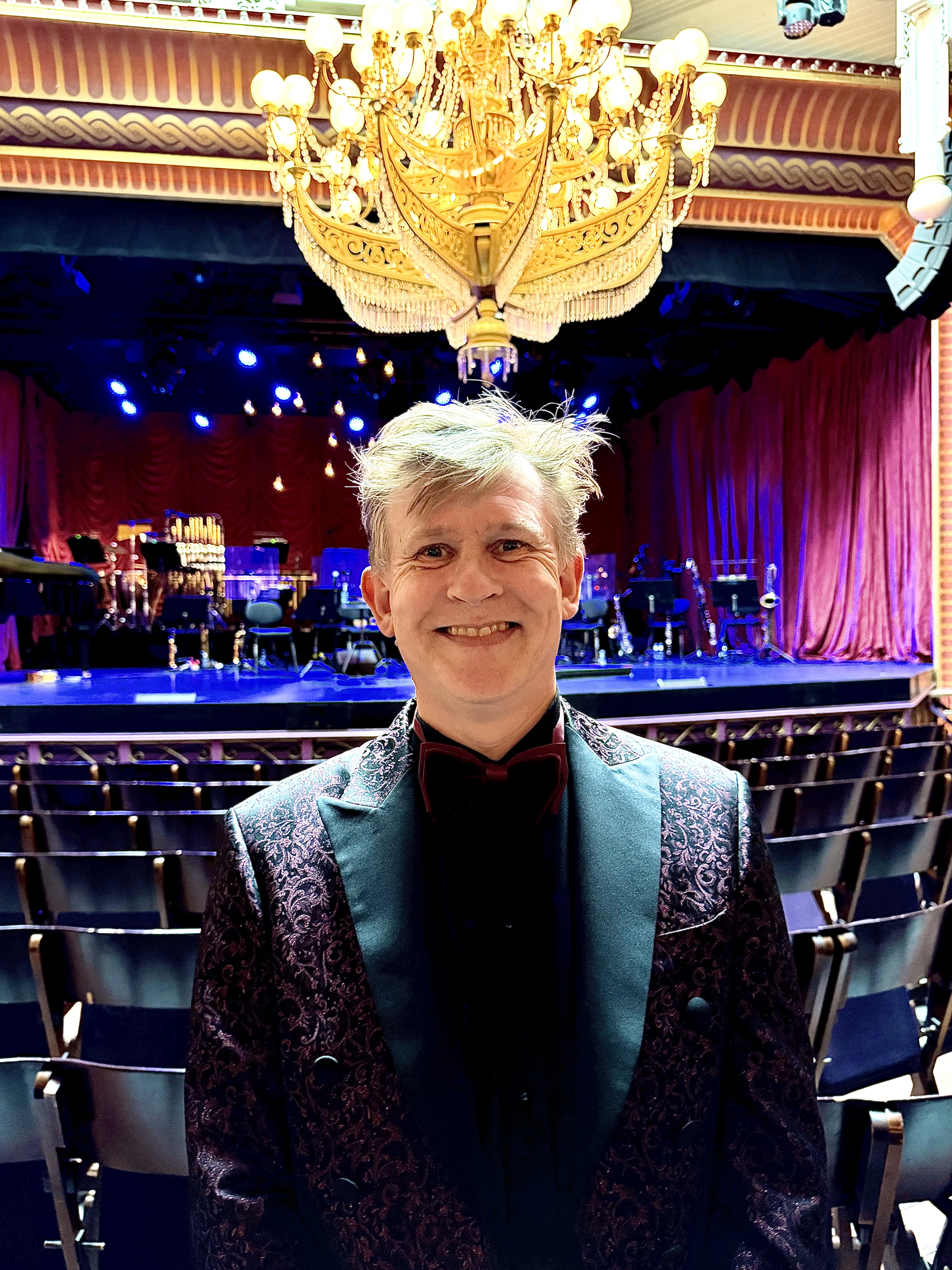
- Mikkel Rønnow at Glassalen (2026)

Background information
- Born: 19 February 1974 (age 52); Odense, Denmark
- Occupations: producer musical director conductor
- Years active: 1992–present
- Label: Spotify
- Partner: Karolina Leedo (2013-present)
- Website: www.mikkelrønnow.dk

Mikkel Rønnow (born 19 February 1974 in Odense) is a theatrical producer and musical director. Since 1992, he has produced musicals, concerts and plays in Denmark. In the years 2001-2004, Rønnow ran the production company Rossen & Rønnow in collaboration with Stig Rossen. From 2009-2013, he was the chief producer at Aarhus Theatre. Since 2016, he has been the sole owner of Mikkel Rønnow Musicals, a producing and general managing company.

Rønnow is the originating producer of the international Lennon–McCartney show She Loves You, which premiered in Copenhagen in March 2022. Other shows include six productions of Chess, as well as Sweeney Todd, Atlantis, West Side Story, Les Misérables, La Cage Aux Folles, My Fair Lady, Copacabana (Scandinavian premiere), Grease, Cabaret, Dirty Dancing, Saturday Night Fever, and Margrethe - a musical about the Danish queen. Margrethe was premiered under Rønnow's direction June - September 2023 in The Royal Danish Theatre and The Concert Hall of Aarhus.

Rønnow's musical direction can be heard on numerous cast albums, including the internationally acclaimed complete recording of Chess from 2002 as well as Copacabana, Grease and the Lloyd Webber album Look With Your Heart, starring Louise Fribo and Odense Symphony Orchestra. He is a member of the Danish Conductors Association.

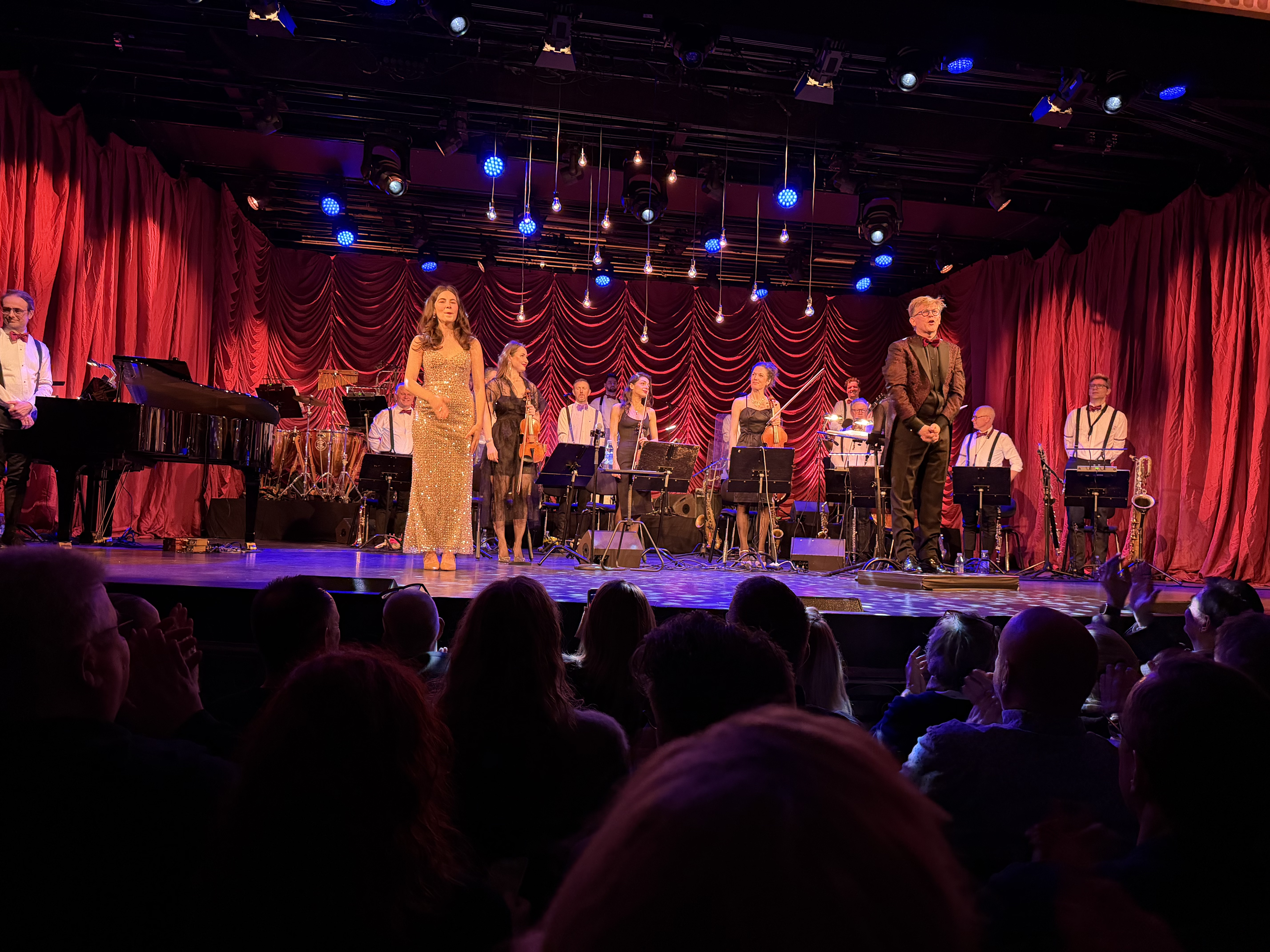
Stella Cole and Mikkel Rønnow bows

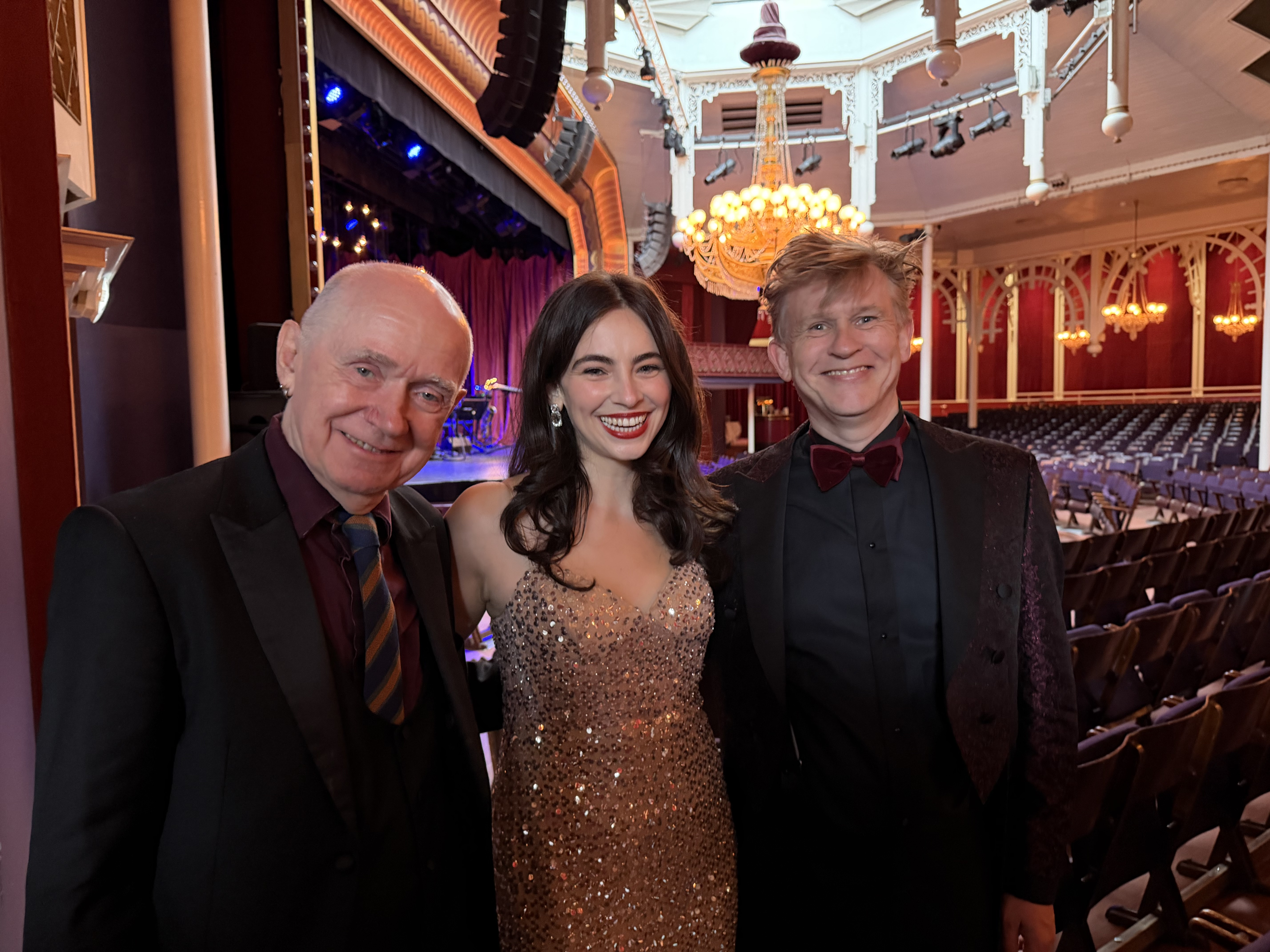
From left: arranger Derek Williams, singer Stella Cole, conductor Mikkel Rønnow

Glass Hall (Tivoli Gardens) concert 19 April 2026

On 19 April 2026, Rønnow and his orchestra presented two concerts by American jazz singer Stella Cole at the Glass Hall (Tivoli Gardens) Theatre ("Glassalen"), that featured arrangements by Alan Broadbent and Jesper Riis, with two newly commissioned arrangements of the Judy Garland classics "The Man That Got Away" and "Almost Like Being in Love" by Scottish composer Derek Williams based on those he originally scored for Caroline O'Connor (actress) at the Sydney Opera House. The concerts played to capacity audiences, who gave Cole and Rønnow spontaneous standing ovations, and received favourable reviews, with critic Michael Søby writing:

The newly renovated Glassal in Tivoli provided the perfect setting for one (of several) concerts featuring the American singer Stella Cole, whose interpretations of classic musical numbers have brought her worldwide fame via the internet.
This afternoon she was accompanied by Mikkel Rønnow’s exceptionally talented 16-piece musical orchestra, which set just the right mood from the outset and effortlessly transported us back to the golden age of film musicals from the 1930s to the 1950s.

GAFFA magazine described Cole as "an absolutely worthy heir to names like Doris Day and Judy Garland." Out&About magazine wrote, "The orchestra, under Mikkel Rønnow's expert leadership, gives some solos that lift the jazz club atmosphere up to the Glassalen chandelier."

On 28 March 2027, during her live tour of the UK, Cole will star in a concert performance at the Adelphi Theatre, London, with Rønnow as conductor and Broadbent, Riis and Williams retained to score new arrangements.

== Recordings ==
- Atlantis - complete symphonic live recording med Stig Rossen, Johanne Milland, Thomas Høj Falkenberg, Kaya Brüel (2022)
- Chess - Dansk cast album med Stig Rossen og Xenia Lach-Nielsen (2018)
- Symphonic - Diva & Maestro (City of Prague Philharmonic Orchestra) (2013)
- Look With Your Heart - Louise Fribo sings Andrew Lloyd Webber (Odense Symphony Orchestra) (2012)
- Chess - Cast album fra Aarhus Teater med bl.a. da:Maria Lucia Rosenberg, Philip Jalmelid og Jonas Malmsjö (2012)
- Grease - da:Sofie Lassen-Kahlke, da:Trine Gadeberg, da:Tomas Ambt Kofod, Bjarne Langhoff (2004)
- Copacabana - Stig Rossen, Melody Jones m.fl. (2003)
- Chess - Stig Rossen, Emma Kershaw, Zubin Varla m.fl. (2001)
