= Portrait (Samara Joy album) =

Studio album by Samara Joy
- Released: October 11, 2024
- Studio: Van Gelder Studio
- Genre: Jazz
- Length: 43:52
- Label: Verve
- Producers: Samara Joy; Brian Lynch

Samara Joy chronology
A Joyful Holiday (2023)	Portrait (2024)

Portrait is the third studio album by American singer Samara Joy. It was released on October 11, 2024, by Verve Records and contained eight tracks of jazz standards and covers from the Great American Songbook. The album was derived from Joy and her seven-piece band experimenting onstage while on the road touring and performing. Portrait received critical acclaim from music magazines including Forbes, AllMusic and Jazzwise. The album won Joy her third Grammy Award for Best Jazz Vocal Album at the 2026 ceremony.

== Background ==
Inspired by the jazz recordings of Ella Fitzgerald, Billie Holiday and Sarah Vaughan, Samara Joy was drawn to jazz while in college. Through the help of a GoFundMe campaign, her eponymous debut album was released in 2021. She then signed with the Verve label in 2022, which issued the album Linger Awhile, which not only drew critical acclaim but also brought her two accolades from the Grammy Awards. Joy's first extended play (EP) was released in 2023 titled A Joyful Holiday and was followed by Portrait in 2024. Joy was inspired to make Portrait based on the performances she and her band were experimenting with onstage. She also credited recordings by Duke Ellington and arrangements by Benny Golson for paving a musical direction for the album.

== Recording and content ==
Portrait was recorded at the Van Gelder Studio in Englewood Cliffs, New Jersey with production credited to Brian Lynch and Joy herself. In an interview with Forbes, Joy explained that while she was always a confident singer, she lacked confidence in the recording studio until the making of Portrait. It was after multiple experiences on the road working on arrangements and experimenting with new sounds that Joy found the confidence to serve as co-producer. "I realized that I had all the tools all along, but I just needed time to shape them up a little bit," she recalled.

The album's only instrumentation was Joy's seven-piece touring band: Jason Charos, David Mason, Kendric MacAllister, Donovan Austin, Conner Rohrer, Felix Moseholm and Evan Sherman. Joy recorded the album in a live format because wanted it to have a "natural" and "organic" sound. Rather than recording in separate booths, the musicians and Joy cut the project in the studio's small room. The album's songs were recorded in either two or three takes, according to Glide magazine. A total of eight tracks comprised the album, featuring reworkings of music from the Great American Songbook, along with jazz standards. This included a vocal adaptation of Charles Mingus's "Reincarnation of a Lovebird". Other covers include "Autumn Nocturne", "You Stepped Out of a Dream", "No More Blues" and "Day by Day".

== Personnel ==
- Samara Joy – vocals, production
- David Mason – alto saxophone, flute and arrangments
- Kendric McCallister – tenor saxophone and arrangments
- Jason Charos – trumpet and arrangments
- Donavan Austin – trombone and arrangments
- Evan Sherman – drums
- Felix Moseholm – bass
- Connor Rohrer – piano

== Critical reception ==
Professional ratings
Review scores
Source	Rating
AllMusic	4.5/5 stars
Jazzwise	5/5 stars
Mojo	4/5 stars
Tom Hull	B+

Portrait drew a positive critical response following its release. Matt Collar of AllMusic rated the album four out of five stars, finding that it showcased Joy's "broad jazz virtuosity". Collar praised Joy's voice as being "cool and enveloping", finding songs like "Autumn Nocturne" to resemble that of recordings by Sarah Vaughan or Betty Carter. Collar concluded by writing, "Jaw-dropping in its sheer artistry, the performance, as with all of Portrait, underscores just how seemingly limitless Samara Joy's skills are." Jim Hynes of Glide praised the album's arrangements and wrote, "Portrait is far more than a jazz vocal album. Joy enthusiastically and democratically leads her superb octet with innovative arrangements and top notch musicianship." Peter Quinn of Jazzwise magazine gave the album five stars and found the album to be notch above her previous releases, " this follow-up to Samara Joy’s Grammy-winning 2022 album Linger Awhile sees the vocalist, songwriter, arranger and bandleader reach ever greater heights of artistic expression, accompanied by her road-tested band."

== Track listing ==
Portrait
No.	Title	Writer(s)	Length
1.	"You Stepped Out of a Dream"	Gus Kahn; Nacio Herb Brown	4:35
2.	"Reincarnation of a Lovebird"	Charles Mingus; Samara Joy	6:28
3.	"Autumn Nocturne"	Kim Gannon; Joe Myrow	3:47
4.	"Dreams Come True/Peace of Mind"	Joe Myrow; Sun Ra; Kendric McAllister; Samara Joy	7:06
5.	"A Fool in Love (Is Called a Clown)"	Donovan Austin	4:48
6.	"No More Blues"	Jon Hendricks; Antônio Carlos Jobim	5:46
7.	"Now and Then (In Remembrance Of...)"	Barry Harris; Samara Joy	6:28
8.	"Day by Day"	Axel Stordahl; Paul Weston; Sammy Cahn	4:58
Total length:			43:52

== Charts ==
2024 chart performance for Portrait
Chart (2024)	Peak position
UK Jazz & Blues Albums (Official Charts)	7
US Jazz Albums (Billboard)	5
US Top Album Sales (Billboard)	21

2025 chart performance for Portrait
Chart (2025)	Peak position
Australian Jazz & Blues Albums (ARIA)	2

== Release history ==
Release history and formats for Portrait
Region	Date	Format	Label	Ref.
United States	October 11, 2024	CD; vinyl LP; music download; streaming	Verve Records	
Various	October 11, 2024	CD; vinyl LP; music download; streaming	Verve Records	
