= A Joyful Holiday =

EP by Samara Joy
- Released: October 27, 2023
- Venue: The Regent Theater, Arlington, Massachusetts, US (live recording)
- Studio: Sear Sound, New York City, New York US (main recording); Rittenhouse SoundWorks, Philadelphia, Pennsylvania, US (additional recording)
- Genre: Christmas music; Gospel; vocal jazz
- Length: 24:25
- Language: English
- Label: Verve
- Producer: Matt Peirson

Samara Joy chronology
Linger Awhile (2022)	A Joyful Holiday (2023)	Portrait (2024)

Professional ratings
Review scores
Source	Rating
AllMusic	4/5 stars
The Arts Desk	4/5 stars
Jazzwise	4/5 stars

A Joyful Holiday is a 2023 extended play by American vocal jazz singer Samara Joy. It received a warm critical reception and earned the 2025 Grammy Award for Best Jazz Vocal Album.

== Reception ==
Editors at AllMusic rated this album 4 out of 5 stars, with critic Matt Collar writing that "Joy and her ensemble offer gorgeously rendered takes of [1950s standards]" and that the album is "rich with vibrant vocal harmonies that reflect the love Joy has for her family" and it "showcases just how virtuosic and steeped in experience she is as a singer". Writing at The Arts Desk, Sebastian Scotney gave this release 4 out of 5 stars, noting the mix of classic jazz and Gospel music that Joy expresses. Another 4 out of 5 stars came from Chris Pearson of The Times who stated that "this short but sweet mini-album puts that celestial sparkler at the top of the Christmas tree".

== Track listing ==
1. "Warm in December" (Bob Russell) – 4:14
2. "Twinkle Twinkle Little Me" (Ron Miller and William O'Malley) – 4:02
3. "The Christmas Song" (Mel Tormé and Robert Wells) – 3:26
4. "Have Yourself a Merry Little Christmas" (Ralph Blane and Hugh Martin) – 3:46
5. "O Holy Night" (Adolphe Adam) – 5:08
6. "The Christmas Song" (live) (Tormé and Wells) – 3:53

== Personnel ==
- Samara Joy – vocals, liner notes
- Alana Alexander – vocals on "O Holy Night"
- Chris Allen – recording on all studio tracks, engineering, mastering
- Jamie Breiwick – creative direction, design
- Sullivan Fortner – piano on "Warm in December", "Twinkle Twinkle Little Me", "The Christmas Song", and "Have Yourself a Merry Little Christmas"; Hammond B3 on "O Holy Night"; duet vocals on "Twinkle Twinkle Little Me"
- Pasquale Grasso – guitar
- Charles Haynes – drums on "The Christmas Song" (live)
- Andrew Kochinka – assistant engineering on "Warm in December", "Twinkle Twinkle Little Me", "The Christmas Song", "Have Yourself a Merry Little Christmas", and "O Holy Night"
- Tai Linzie – art direction
- Antonio McLendon – vocals on "O Holy Night" and "The Christmas Song" (live)
- Goldwire McLendon – vocals on "O Holy Night"
- Laurone McLendon – vocals on "O Holy Night"
- Shedrick Mitchell – piano on "The Christmas Song" (live)
- Ben Paterson – piano
- Matt Pierson – production
- Michael Richelle – assistant engineering on "Warm in December", "Twinkle Twinkle Little Me", "The Christmas Song", "Have Yourself a Merry Little Christmas", and "O Holy Night"
- Tiera Lovell Rowe – vocals on "O Holy Night"
- Steven Sacco – assistant engineering on "Warm in December", "Twinkle Twinkle Little Me", "The Christmas Song", "Have Yourself a Merry Little Christmas", and "O Holy Night"
- Meredith Truax – photography
- Kenny Washington – drums on "Warm in December", "The Christmas Song", and "Have Yourself a Merry Little Christmas"
- Eric Wheeler – bass guitar on "The Christmas Song" (live)
- David Wong – double bass on "Warm in December", "The Christmas Song", and "Have Yourself a Merry Little Christmas"
- Ryan Yorck – recording on "The Christmas Song" (live)

== Release history ==
Release history and formats for A Joyful Holiday
Region	Date	Format	Label	Ref.
Various	October 27, 2023	CD; vinyl LP; 12-inch EP; music download; streaming	Verve Records	

== See also ==
- 2023 in American music
- 2023 in jazz
- List of 2023 albums
