= Pasquale Grasso =

Italian jazz guitarist

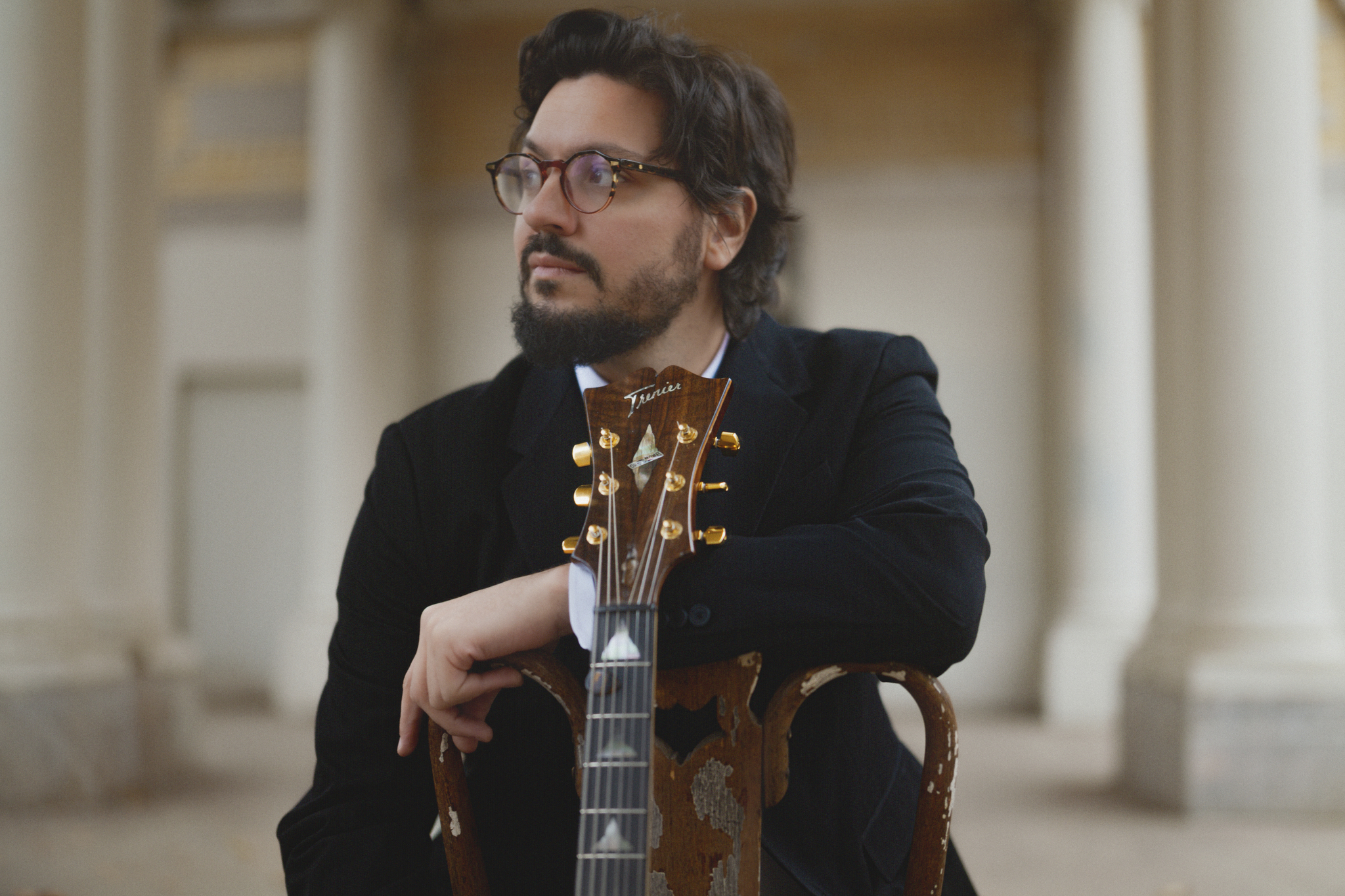

Background information
- Born: October 19, 1988 (age 37); Ariano Irpino, Italy
- Genres: Jazz
- Years active: 2011–present
- Website: www.pasqualegrasso.com

Pasquale Grasso is an Italian-born jazz guitarist based in New York City. He is known for a pianistic approach to jazz guitar influenced by Bud Powell's style, and for using classical position and technique enabled by classical training.

== Early life and musical beginnings ==
Grasso grew up on a farm in Ariano Irpino in the Campania region of Italy. His parents were jazz and classical music lovers. His older brother Luigi took up the saxophone at an early age. Their father bought Pasquale his first guitar when he was five, and by the time he was nine and Luigi was 11 they were performing locally.

Grasso's first important mentor was Agostino Di Giorgio. Then in summer 1998 Pasquale attended Barry Harris' jazz workshop in Switzerland. The educator and bebop pianist brought Pasquale and Luigi into his international workshops, where over the next five years they became instructors. Pasquale became Harris’ guitar teaching assistant and has conducted workshops in Italy, Switzerland, France, Spain, Holland, and Slovenia.

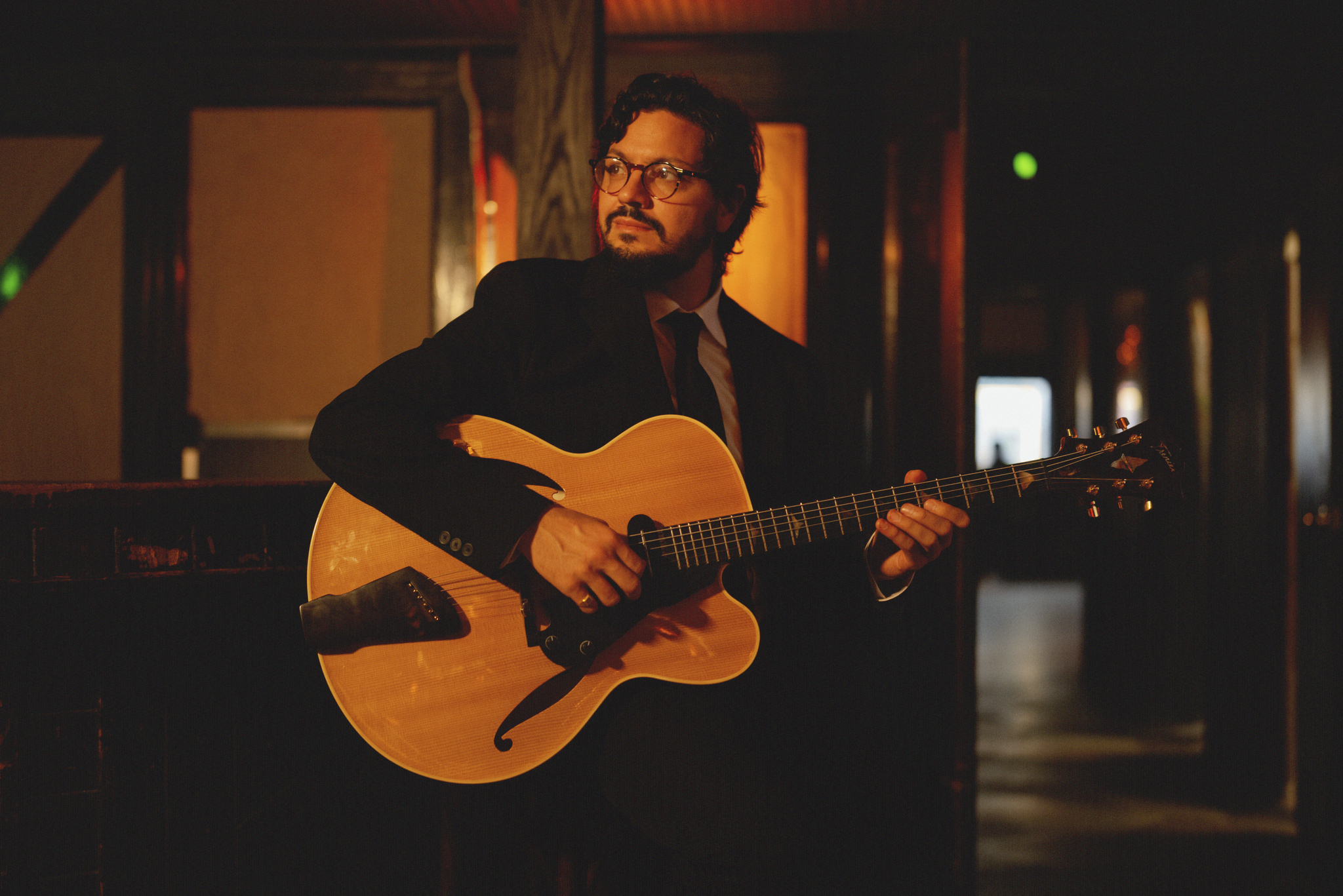

In 2008 Pasquale studied under Walter Zanetti at Bologna’s Conservatorio Giovanni Battista Martini and earned a degree in classical guitar. Here he developed his own approach to jazz guitar, combining classical tradition with Chuck Wayne’s modern technique.

== Music career: 2011–present ==
In 2012 he moved to New York City. He became part of the Ari Roland Quartet and the Chris Byars Quartet, with both of which he toured and recorded. Later that year, Pasquale was named a Jazz Ambassador for the U.S. State Department, and toured on behalf of the embassy in Europe, Kuwait, Kazakhstan, Cyprus, Lithuania, Ukraine, and other places.

In 2015 he released his debut album, Reflections of Me. Earlier the same year he and harmonica player Yvonnick Prené released the album Merci Toots which included tunes by Toots Thielemans, Bud Powell, Thelonious Monk and Charlie Parker.

Also in 2015 he won the Wes Montgomery International Jazz Guitar Competition.

In 2017, Pasquale signed with Sony Masterworks and, working with producer Matt Pierson, recorded a series of solo recordings, released as digital EPs, beginning in 2019 and starting with Solo Standards Vol. 1 followed by Solo Ballads Vol.1, Solo Monk, Solo Bud Powell, Solo Holiday, and Solo Bird. An album comprising tracks from these recordings was released as Solo Masterpieces in 2020.

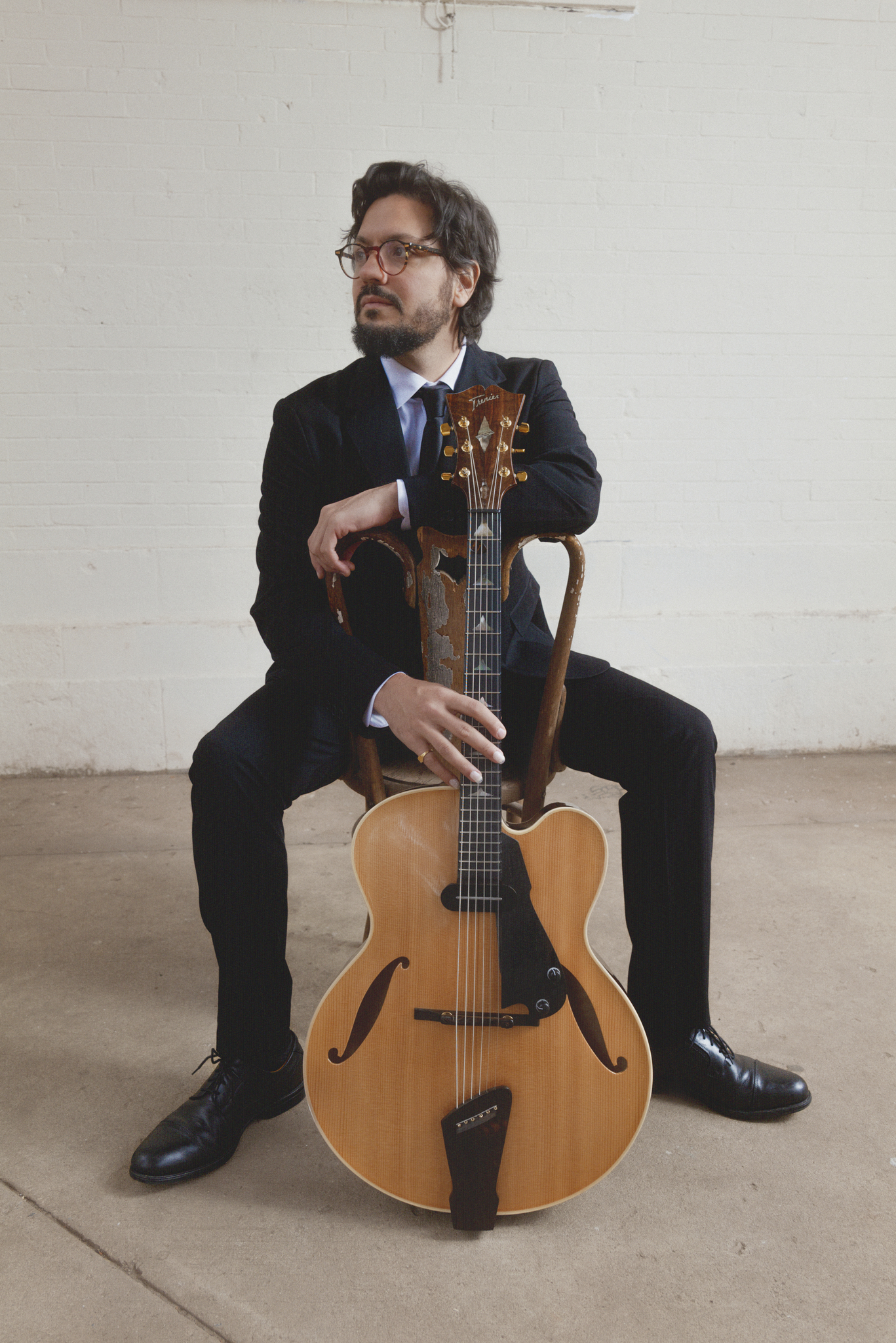

In November 2020 he performed a run of shows with Laura Benanti in October 2021 at Feinstein’s/54 Below and was featured on Benanti's 2020 self-titled album and on her "Go Slow" single and video. He appeared with Benanti again in 2021, at Feinstein's Diamond Series concert.

On 17 September 2021 Sony Masterworks released his album of Duke Ellington covers, Pasquale Plays Duke, with bassist Ari Roland and drummer Keith Balla and guest vocalists Samara Joy and Sheila Jordan. The same year he appeared leading the trio backing Samara Joy on her album Samara Joy. On 15 February 2022 he performed on the Today Show with Samara Joy, and appeared on her 2022 album Linger Awhile.

In 2022, Grasso earned a Grammy Award for his work on Linger Awhile, the debut studio album by jazz vocalist Samara Joy, which won Best Jazz Vocal Album.

In 2024, he was recognized by DownBeat magazine as Guitarist of the Year in their Rising Star category.

In 2025, Grasso released Fervency with Sony Masterworks, an album featuring his longtime collaborators Keith Balla on drums and Ari Roland on double bass.

He has had residencies at New York City clubs including Birdland Jazz Club in Hell’s Kitchen and Mezzrow in the West Village.

Pasquale plays a "Modello Pasquale Grasso” guitar made for him by American luthier Bryant Trenier, who lives in France and uses a restored 1953 Gibson GA-50 amp.

== Discography ==
=== Albums and EPs as leader ===
Album	Month/ Year	Label
Fervency	Feb 2025	Sony Masterworks
Be-Bop!	Jun 2022	Sony Masterworks
Pasquale Plays Duke	Sep 2021	Sony Masterworks
Solo Ballads	Apr 2021	Sony Masterworks
Solo Standards	Oct 2020	Sony Masterworks
Solo Bird (EP)	Aug 2020	Sony Masterworks
Solo Bud Powell	May 2020	Sony Masterworks
Solo Masterpieces	Mar 2020	Sony Masterworks
Solo Holiday (EP)	Nov 2019	Sony Masterworks
Solo Monk (EP)	Oct 2019	Sony Masterworks
Solo Ballads Vol.1 (EP)	Aug 2019	Sony Masterworks
Solo Standards Vol.1 (EP)	Jun 2019	Sony Masterworks
In the Mood for a Classic (with Renaud Penant)	Apr 2017	Gut String Records
Reflections of Me	Aug 2015	Grasso Productions
Merci Toots (with Yvonnick Prené)	Jan 2015	Prene Productions

=== As a sideman ===
Recording	Artist	Year	Label
Look Ahead	Chris Byars	2023	Steeplechase
Linger Awhile	Samara Joy	2022	Verve
Samara Joy	Samara Joy	2021	Whirlwind Recordings
Laura Benanti	Laura Benanti	2020	Sony Masterworks
Night at the Movies	Svetlana	2019	Starr Records
Workers' Comp	Jamale Davis	2018	Gut String Records
New York City Jazz	Chris Byars	2018	Steeplechase
The Greenwich Session	Luigi Grasso	2018	Camille Productions
We Worked in the Bricks	Jamale Davis	2017	Gut String Records
The Stroller	Zaid Nasser	2017	Steeplechase
The Music of Frank Strozier	Chris Byars	2017	Steeplechase
Play Luigi Grasso's Arrangements	Joan Chamorro Octet	2017	Jazz To Jazz
Two Fives	Chris Byars	2015	Steeplechase
The Music of Duke Jordan	Chris Byars	2014	Steeplechase
