= Bria Skonberg =

Canadian jazz musician

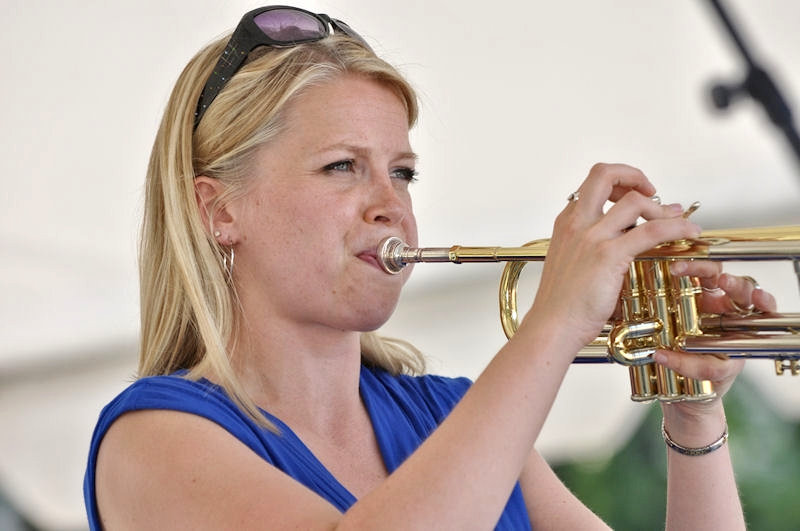
- Skonberg in 2012

Background information
- Born: 1983 (age 42–43); Chilliwack, British Columbia, Canada
- Genre: Jazz
- Occupation: Musician
- Instruments: Trumpet, flugelhorn, vocals
- Labels: Random Act, Sony Masterworks
- Website: briaskonberg.com

Bria Skonberg (born 1983) is a Canadian jazz trumpeter and vocalist.

== Early life ==
Skonberg was born in Chilliwack, British Columbia in 1983; her great-grandparents on her father's side came from Sweden. She took piano lessons in elementary school, switching to trumpet in her early teens. During High School and college she appeared at numerous jazz festivals with The 51st Eight. She also led the all-female Mighty Aphrodite Jazz Band. In 2006, she graduated from Capilano University in Vancouver with a degree in jazz trumpet. She studied with Warren Vaché.

== Career ==
Skonberg was the leader of Bria's Hot Five, taking inspiration from Louis Armstrong's Hot Five. She credits Louis Armstrong as an early inspiration. She also led The Big Bang Jazz Band. She also performed with Canadian jazz veteran Dal Richards and his Orchestra in concert and on recordings.

Skonberg has appeared as a band leader and guest artist at jazz festivals in North America, Europe, China and Japan. She moved to New York City in 2010. She was a co-founder of the New York Hot Jazz Festival.

Skonberg has performed with Bucky Pizzarelli, Howard Alden, and Wycliffe Gordon.

In 2017, Skonberg won the Juno Award for Vocal Jazz Album of the Year, for her crowd-funded album Bria.

Skonberg is also a mentor and teaching artist passing on the jazz tradition, working with institutions such as The Louis Armstrong House Museum's education programs.

In addition to the trumpet, Skonberg also plays the flugelhorn.

== Awards and honors ==
- Jazz Award of Merit, Canadian Broadcasting Corporation, 2006
- Kobe Jazz Street Award, Breda Jazz Festival, 2007
- Outstanding Jazz Artist, New York Bistro Award
- Nomination, Artist of the Year, Jazz Journalists Association, 2013
- Swing! Award, Jazz at Lincoln Center, 2015
- Winner, Juno Award Jazz Vocal Album, 2017

== Discography ==
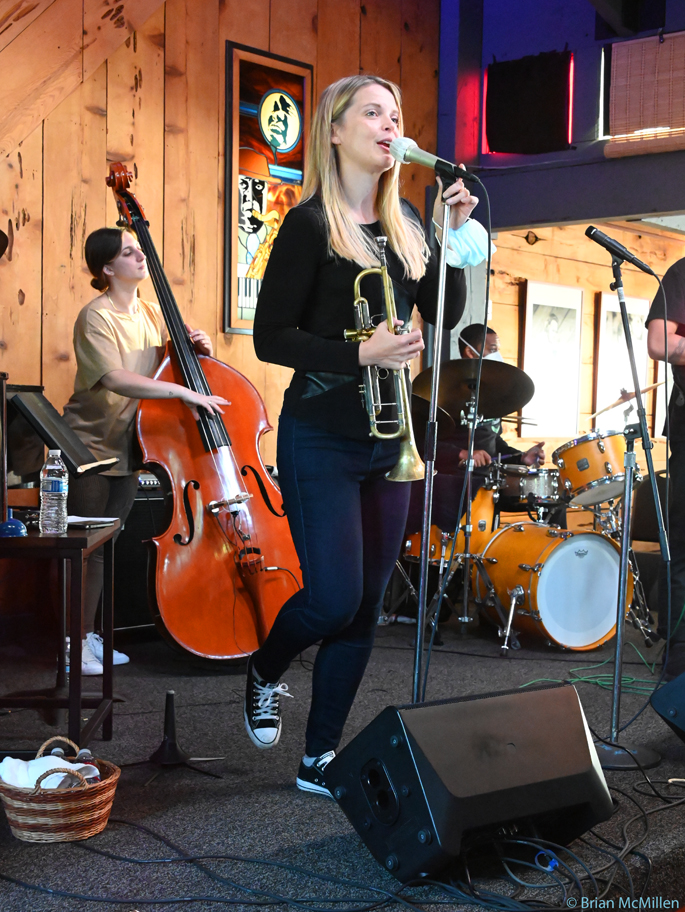
Skonberg performing in 2021

- Fresh (Lighter Than Air, 2009)
- So Is the Day (Random Act, 2012)
- Into Your Own (Random Act, 2014)
- Bria (Sony Masterworks, 2016)
- With a Twist (Sony, 2017)
- Nothing Never Happens (self-released, 2019)
- Brass (Cellar Music Group, 2026)
