= Ben Paterson =

American jazz pianist, organist, and composer

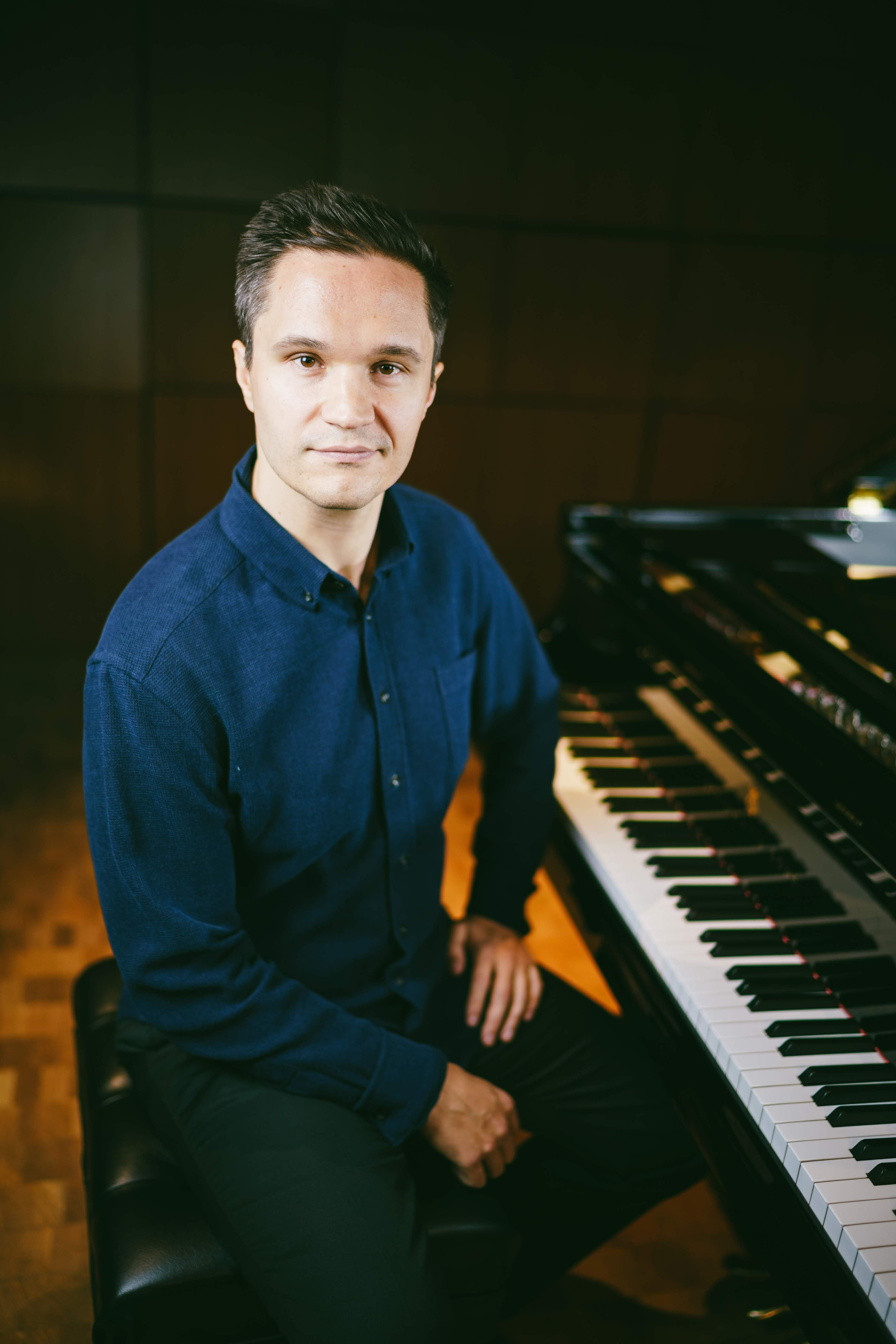
- circa 2019

Background information
- Born: June 23, 1982 (age 44); Philadelphia, Pennsylvania
- Genres: Jazz
- Occupation: Musician
- Instrument: Piano
- Website: benpaterson.com

Ben Paterson (born June 23, 1982) is an American jazz pianist, organist, composer, and Steinway Artist.

== Early life ==
Paterson graduated from the Settlement Music School in Philadelphia after having spent his earlier years studying classical as well as jazz music. He then relocated to Chicago in 2004 to attend the University of Chicago.

== Later life and career ==
Starting in 2005, Paterson began working as a pianist for Von Freeman, an NEA Jazz Master in Chicago. They performed on a regular basis until Freeman's death in August 2012. In the same year, Paterson relocated to New York City to further his professional music career and gain more exposure in the jazz world.

Paterson has performed as an opening act for B.B. King, Buddy Guy, and Steely Dan, at the 2010 Montreal Jazz Fest, the 2006, 2009, and 2013 Chicago Jazz Fests, the 2007, 2008, and 2011 Chicago Blues Fests, as well as shows in France, China, Switzerland, Mexico, Sweden, and Taiwan.

Paterson was the winner of the inaugural Ellis Marsalis Jazz Piano Competition, held in 2018. The prize included $25,000 cash.

Starting in 2019 Paterson became one of only a few jazz musicians who are designated Steinway Artists.

Paterson performed on Samara Joy's Grammy Award-winning second album, Linger Awhile, on Verve Records. The album also features drummer Kenny Washington, guitarist Pasquale Grasso, and bassist David Wong.

In 2024, Paterson appeared on Bobby Broom's new album Jamalot (Live).

== Discography ==
- Breathing Space (OA2, 2007)
- Blues For Oscar (Meetinghouse Records, 2012)
- Essential Elements (Maxjazz, 2013)
- For Once in My Life (Origin, 2015)
- Live at Van Gelder's (Cellar Live, 2018)
- That Old Feeling (Cellar Live, 2018)
- I'll Be Thanking Santa (Meetinghouse Records, 2019)
- Cookin' in the Couvre (Cellar Live, 2024)
