= Samara Joy (album) =

Studio album by Samara Joy
- Released: July 9, 2021
- Recorded: October 20–21, 2020
- Studio: Oktaven Audio, Mt. Vernon, New York
- Genre: Jazz
- Length: 42:02
- Label: Whirlwind
- Producer: Matt Pierson

Samara Joy chronology
Samara Joy (2021)	Linger Awhile (2022)

Professional ratings
Review scores
Source	Rating
Jazzwise	4/5 stars
The Observer	4/5 stars
Tom Hull	B+

Samara Joy is the debut studio album by American jazz singer Samara Joy. Whirlwind released the album on July 9, 2021. The album features Joy performing jazz standards from the Great American Songbook, accompanied by the trio of guitarist Pasquale Grasso, bassist Ari Roland, and drummer Kenny Washington.

== Background ==
Samara Joy gained significant attention in the jazz world after winning the prestigious Sarah Vaughan International Jazz Vocal Competition in 2019. Prior to the album's release, she had already become a prominent figure in New York's jazz clubs, performing at venues such as Dizzy's Club, Smoke Jazz Club, and Minton's Playhouse. The album was produced by Matt Pierson, a Grammy-nominated veteran producer who had previously worked with several labels, including Blue Note and Warner Bros.

To record the album, Joy drew inspiration from many jazz vocalists including Sarah Vaughan, Ella Fitzgerald, Billie Holiday, Nat King Cole, and Carmen McRae. She stated to told GRAMMY.com: "This music is my foundation for sure. When I want to learn a song and learn how to tell a story, they're who I go to for perspective."

== Reception ==
Dave Gelly of The Observer wrote: "Her approach is simple but beautifully poised, and when she does take off on an improvised passage or coda, the trickiest notes present no problem. The album cover lists 12 tracks, but there are actually 13, and that last one, Sophisticated Lady, is the best of the lot for me – delicately phrased and full of feeling. The accompaniment is by a trio led by Pasquale Grasso, a guitarist with the most phenomenal technique and an endless flow of ideas." Peter Quinn of Jazzwise stated: "This self-titled debut from the winner of the 2019 competition, Samara Joy McLendon, reveals another outstanding vocalist, one who appears to have listened to the Vaughan/Fitzgerald canon and absorbed elements from both into her own aesthetic orbit."

== Track listing ==
No.	Title	Writer(s)	Length
1.	"Stardust"	Hoagy Carmichael, Mitchell Parish	3:53
2.	"Everything Happens to Me"	Thomas Adair, Matt Dennis	3:49
3.	"If You Never Fall in Love with Me"	Sam Jones, Donald E. Wolf	2:34
4.	"Let's Dream in the Moonlight"	Matt Malneck, Raoul Walsh	2:47
5.	"It Only Happens Once"	Frankie Laine	4:22
6.	"If You'd Stay the Way I Dream About You"	Arthur Herzog, Jr., Irene Kitchings	2:03
7.	"Jim"	James Caesar Petrillo, Milton Samuels, Shawn A. Nelson	3:53
8.	"(It's Easy to See) The Trouble with Me Is You"	Roy Alfred, Marvin Fisher	3:59
9.	"Lover Man (Oh Where Can You Be)"	Jimmy Davis, Roger Ramirez, James Sherman	2:37
10.	"Moonglow"	Edgar DeLange, Will Hudson, Irving Mills	3:23
11.	"But Beautiful"	Johnny Burke, Jimmy Van Heusen	5:02
Total length:			42:02

== Personnel ==
- Samara Joy – vocals
- Ari Roland – double bass
- Kenny Washington – drums
- Pasquale Grasso – guitar
