= Samara Joy =

American jazz singer (born 1999)

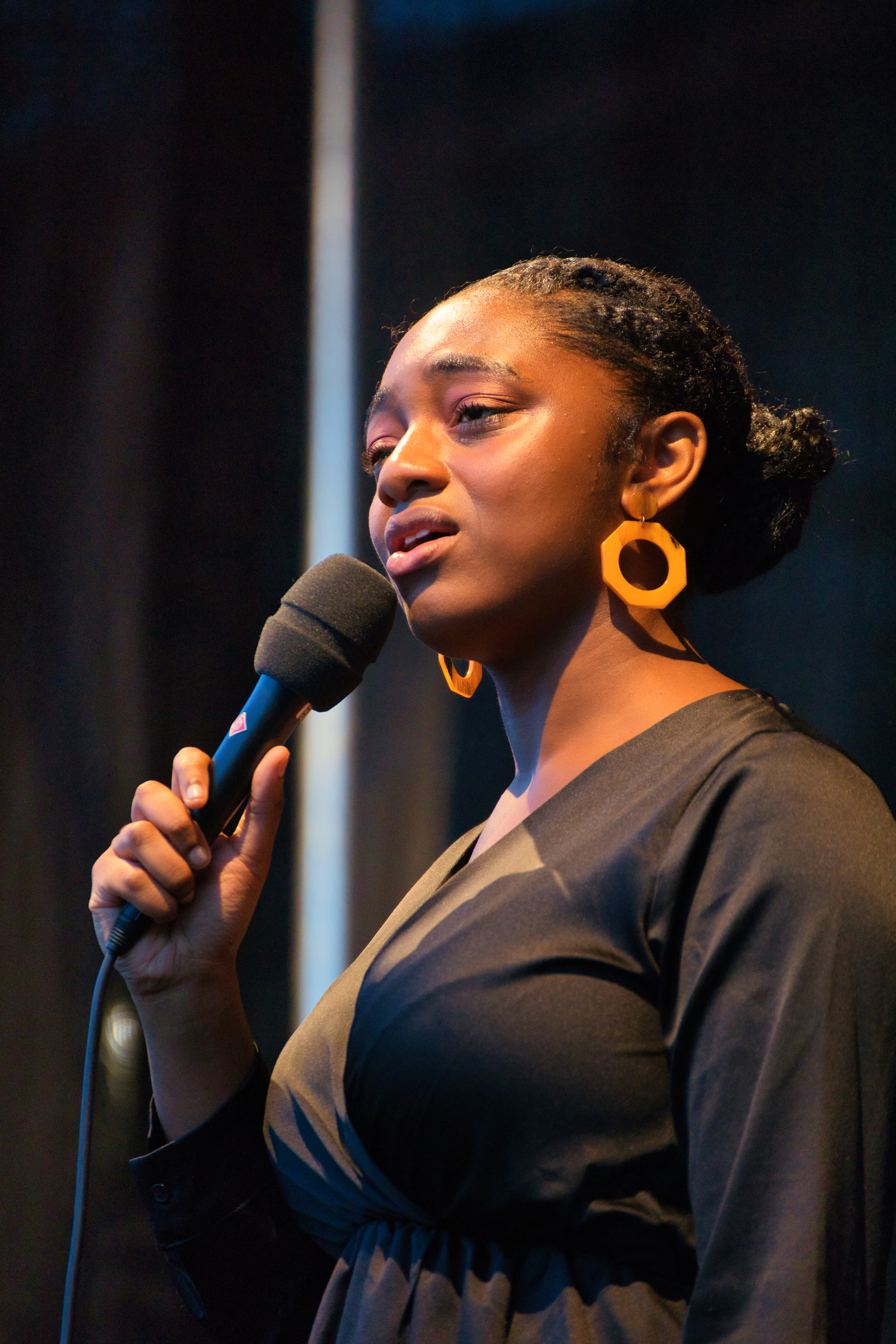
- Joy in 2022

Background information
- Born: Samara Joy McLendon; November 11, 1999 (age 26); Bronx, New York, U.S.
- Genres: Jazz; R&B; soul; gospel
- Occupations: Singer; songwriter
- Years active: 2019–present
- Labels: Whirlwind; Verve
- Website: samarajoy.com

Samara Joy McLendon (born November 11, 1999) is an American jazz singer. She released her self-titled debut album in 2021 and was subsequently named Best New Artist by JazzTimes. Her second album, Linger Awhile (2022), reached number one on the Billboard Jazz Albums chart. She has received six Grammy Awards, including Best New Artist in 2023, and three wins each for Best Jazz Vocal Album (2023, 2025 and 2026) and Best Jazz Performance (2024 and 2025).

== Early life and education ==
A native of the Castle Hill neighborhood of the Bronx, New York City, Joy was born in 1999 into a musical family. Her paternal grandparents, Elder Goldwire and Ruth McLendon, were founders of Philadelphia gospel group The Savettes. Her grandfather, Elder Goldwire McLendon was also a finalist on season 3 of BET's Gospel Talent show Sunday Best. Her father, Antonio McLendon (a vocalist and bass player who has toured with gospel musician Andraé Crouch) introduced her to gospel greats such as The Clark Sisters, and soul and Motown music. She attended Fordham High School for the Arts and performed in its jazz band. During this time, she won Best Vocalist at the Essentially Ellington festival, a high school competition hosted by Jazz at Lincoln Center.

She first encountered jazz in a meaningful way when she enrolled in the jazz program at SUNY's Purchase College as a voice major, and was named an Ella Fitzgerald Scholar. Friends there introduced her to the recordings of great jazz vocalists including Sarah Vaughan and Fitzgerald, and such instrumentalists as Kenny Washington, Jon Faddis (with whom she studied), and Ingrid Jensen. Drawing inspiration from jazz icon Billie Holiday, Joy later performed Holiday's "Left Alone" and has channeled much of her style on the modern stage.

== Career ==
In 2019, as Samara McLendon, she won the Sarah Vaughan International Jazz Vocal Competition. One of the judges during that competition, world-renowned bassist Christian McBride, described Joy as a "once-in-a-generation talent." Working with producer and eventual manager Matt Pierson, she recorded her self-titled debut album while still in college, graduating magna cum laude in 2021. Samara Joy was released on July 9, 2021, on Whirlwind Recordings. Jazz Times named her Best New Artist for 2021. In February 2021, she was featured in Women of Color on Broadway, Inc.'s music video of "Summertime" from Porgy and Bess. In an interview, film director Regina King called her "a young woman who seems like Sarah Vaughan and Ella Fitzgerald are both living in her body."

She released a number of viral video performances, including one that had been viewed more than 1.5 million times as of October 2020. These videos had as of November 2022 gained her 200,000 followers on TikTok. Partly on the strength of this success, she toured Europe, including a series of sold-out concerts in Italy and Austria. In 2021 and continuing into 2022, she toured the U.S., including bookings at the 2022 Monterey Jazz Festival, Lincoln Center Summer For The City's Jazz Underground series, Winter Jazzfest, and other festivals, as well as in Europe.

On February 15, 2022, she performed on Today with guitarist Pasquale Grasso and performed again on Today in September 2022. On June 15, 2022, she was featured at Carnegie Hall's 16th Annual Notable Occasion, and appeared at the Newport Jazz Festival. She was featured on jazz pianist Julius Rodriguez's 2022 album Let Sound Tell All.

On September 16, 2022, she released her second album, Linger Awhile, on Verve Records. The album features drummer Kenny Washington, guitarist Pasquale Grasso, pianist Ben Paterson, and bassist David Wong. Her bookings for Winter 2022 included singing with the Jazz at Lincoln Center Orchestra on its Big Band Holidays tour. As part of another holiday campaign, Joy teamed with Theory and debuted her new single "Now and Then" exclusively with the New York City–based fashion brand. She noted Billie Holiday as an inspiration for her glamorous style.

She was nominated and won two awards at the Grammy Awards in 2023: Best Jazz Vocal Album for Linger Awhile and Best New Artist. At the Grammy Awards in 2024, she was nominated and won the award for Best Jazz Performance with her single "Tight." She was nominated and won two more awards at the Grammy Awards in 2025: Best Jazz Performance with "Twinkle Twinkle Little Me" and Best Jazz Vocal Album for A Joyful Holiday.

== Discography ==
Studio albums

- Samara Joy (2021)
- Linger Awhile (2022)
- Portrait (2024)

== Awards and honors ==
=== Grammy Awards ===
Year	Category	Nominated work	Result	Ref.
2023	Best New Artist	Herself	Won	
2023	Best Jazz Vocal Album	Linger Awhile	Won	
2024	Best Jazz Performance	"Tight"	Won	
2025	Best Jazz Performance	"Twinkle Twinkle Little Me" (with Sullivan Fortner)	Won	
2025	Best Jazz Vocal Album	A Joyful Holiday	Won	
2026	Best Jazz Vocal Album	Portrait	Won	
2026	Best Jazz Performance	"Peace of Mind / Dreams Come True"	Nominated	

=== Miscellaneous awards ===
Year	Association	Category	Nominated work	Result	Ref.
2019	Sarah Vaughan International Jazz Vocal Competition			Won	
2021	JazzTimes	Best New Artist		Won	
2022	Jazz Music Awards	Best New Jazz Artist		Won	
2023	NAACP Image Awards	Outstanding Jazz Album – Vocal	Linger Awhile	Nominated	
