= Glass Hall (Tivoli Gardens) =

Theatre in Copenhagen, Denmark

Glass Hall Theatre
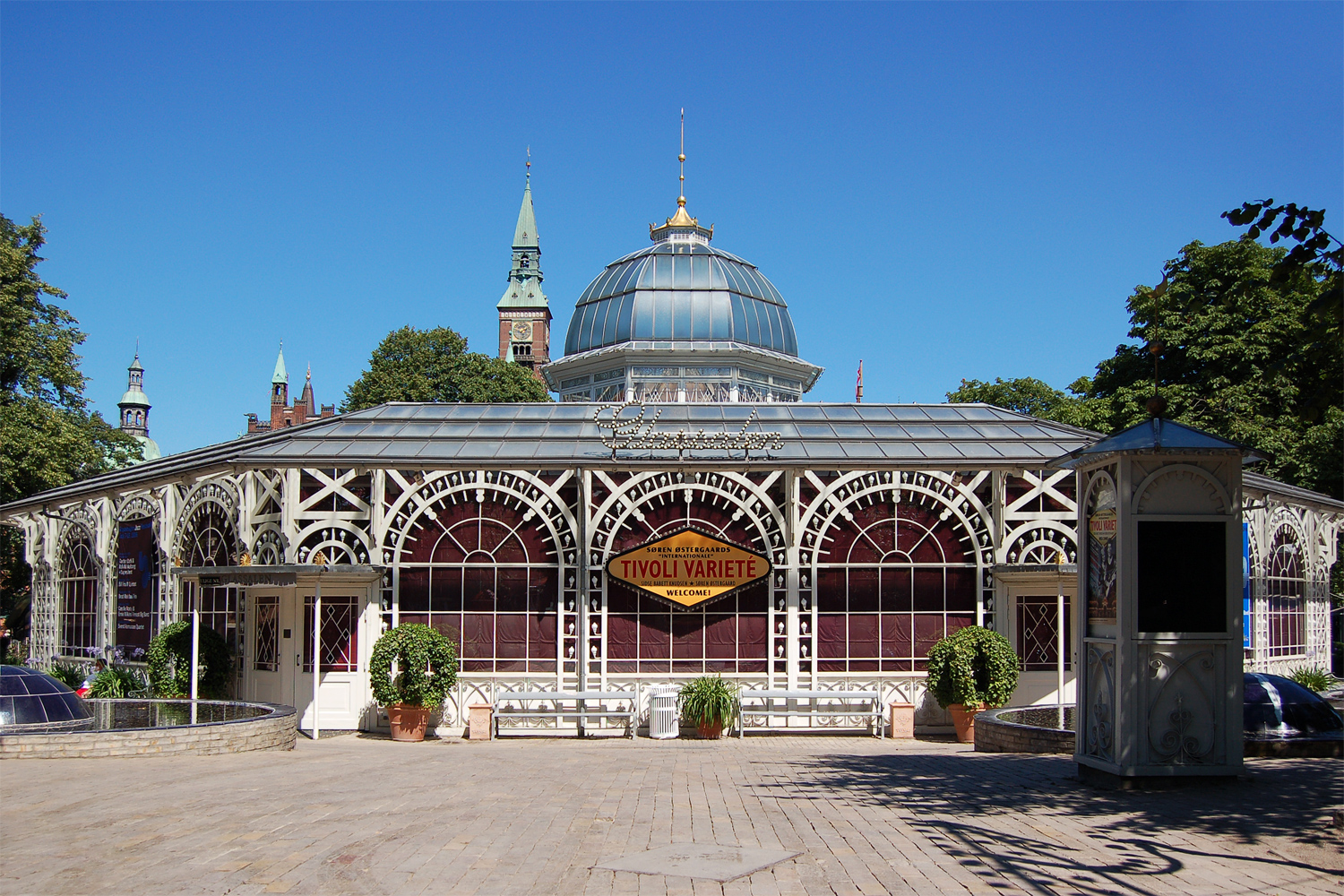
- Interactive map of Glass Hall Theatre
- Address: Tivoli Gardens; Copenhagen; Denmark
- Coordinates: 55.6739°N 12.5685°E
- Capacity: 957 numbered seats
- Type: Event venue (current)

Construction
- Opened: 1863
- Architect: Poul Henningsen

Website
- Official website

The Glass Hall (Danish: Glassalen) is a 957-seat theatre venue located inside the Tivoli Gardens in Copenhagen, Denmark.

== History ==
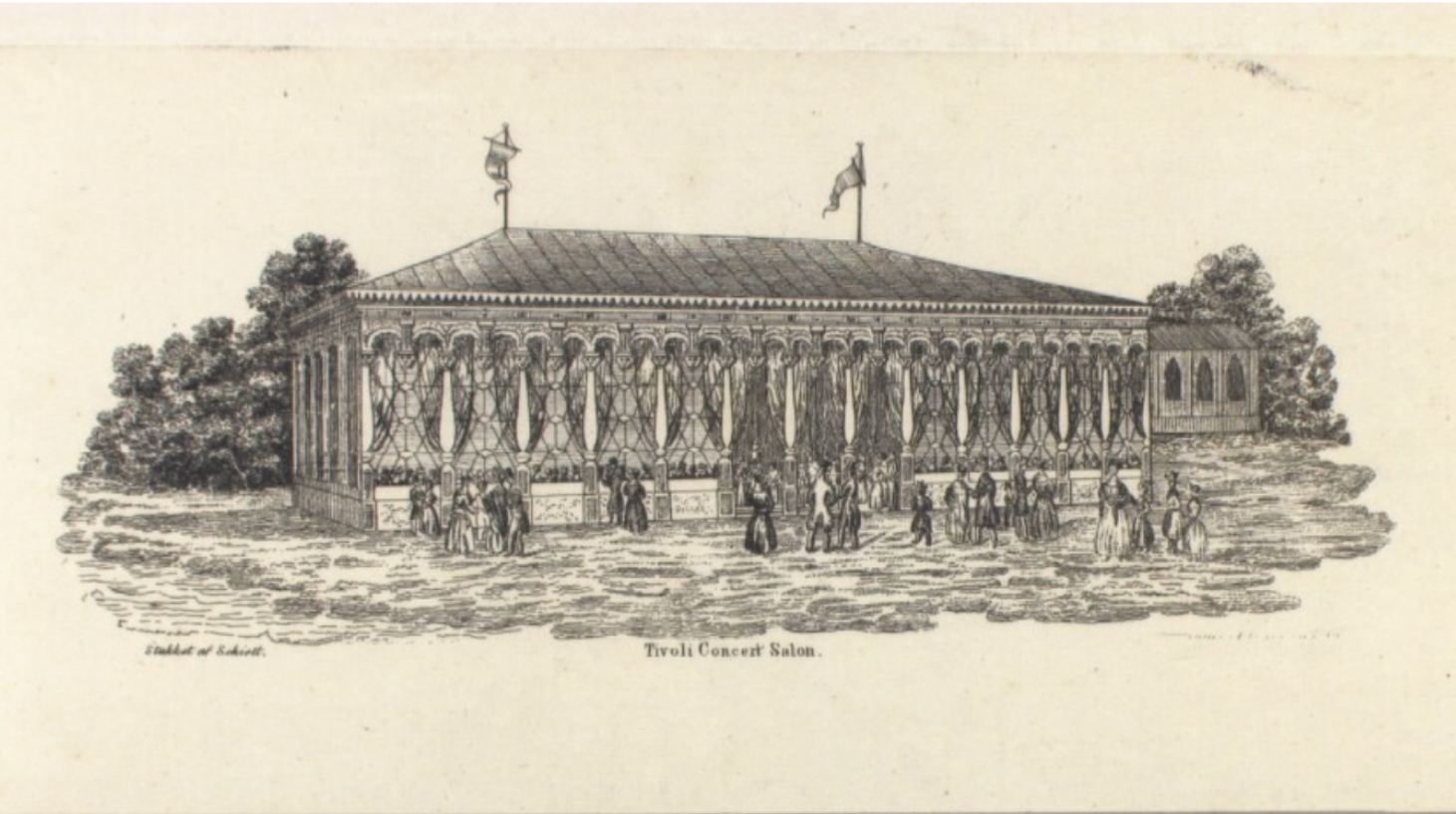
The first concert hall

A concert hall was among the attractions when Tivoli Gardens first opened its doors in 1843. It was a rectangular, wooden building designed by Harald Conrad Stilling.

Hans Christian Lumbye was music director and chief conductor from 1843 until 1872. He wrote almost 700 compositions for the orchestra, especially polkas, valses and galops.

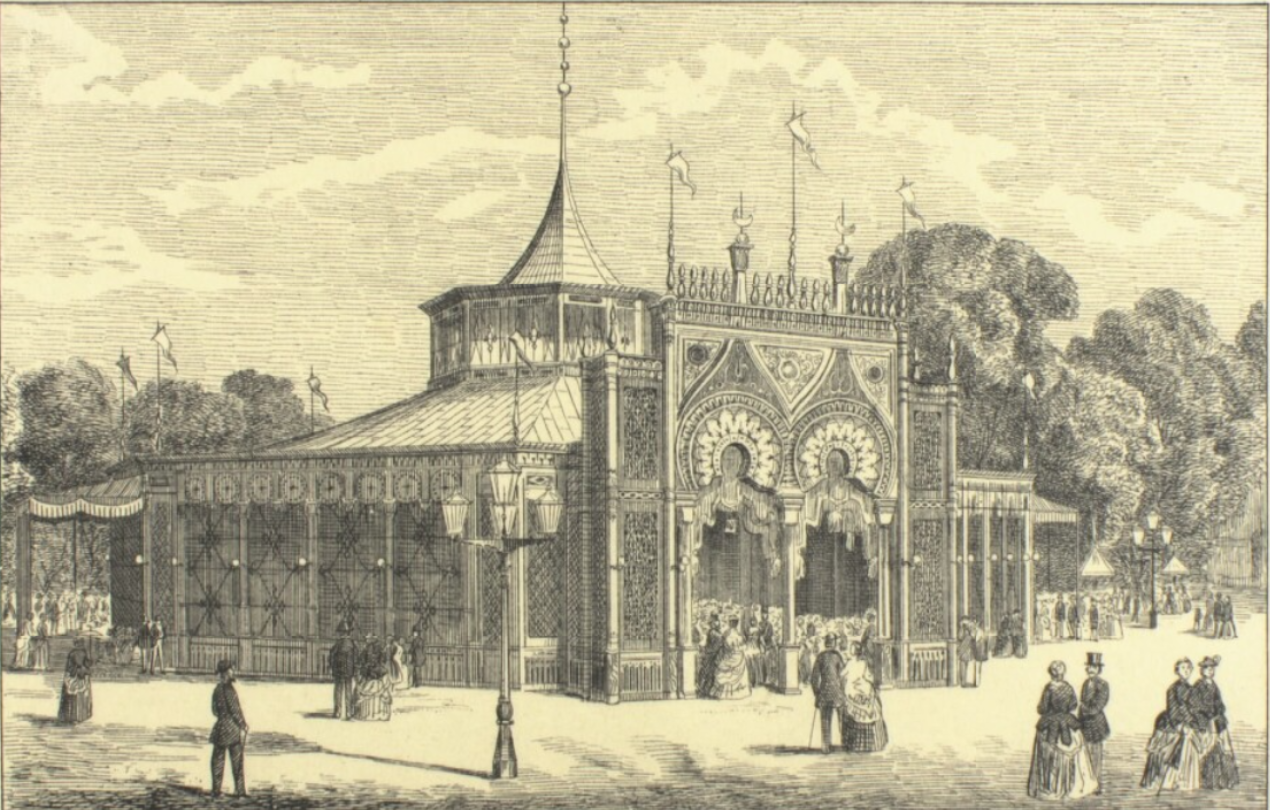
The Glass Hall Building from 1863

The concert hall was expanded by Johan Andreas Stillmann in 1863. The building was once again adapted in 1885.

The building became known as Teatersalen after a new Tivoli Concert Hall was inaugurated in 1902.

The Glass Hall was subject to schalburgtage in 1944 and subsequently rebuilt by Poul Henningsen in 1946. Stig Lommer (19 June 1907, Copenhagen - 28 June 1976, Skagen) was artistic director of annual summer revues from 1949. The opening show was called Festfyrværkeri med Hornbækrevyen. Lommer left the Glass Hall in the late 1950s. Osvald Helmuth and Max Hansen were prominent acts in the period until 1973. Otto Lington was band leader in 1951-52 and again from 1958 to 1973.

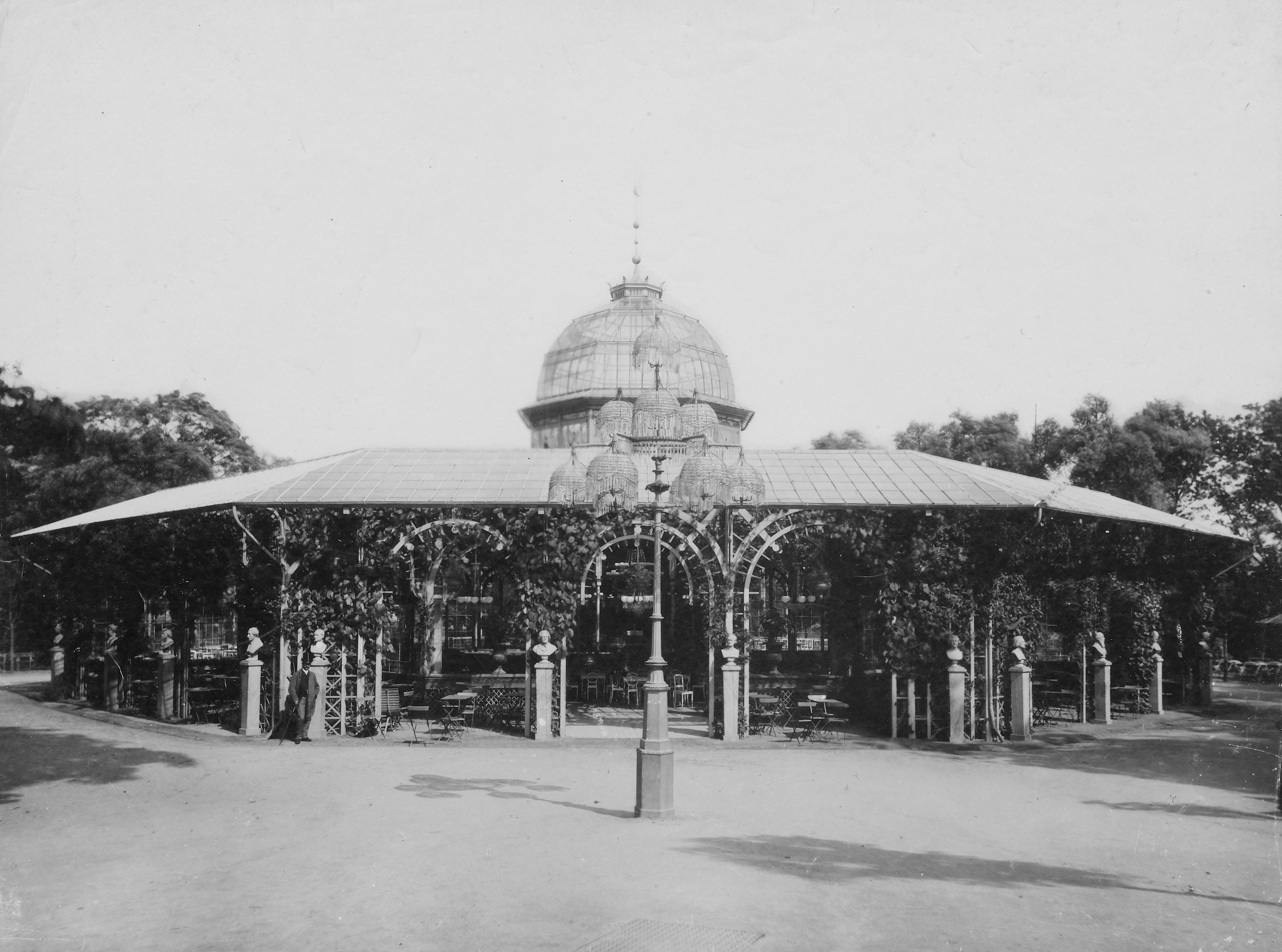
Glassalen in c. 1899.

Aage Stentoft was director of the Tivoli Theatre from 1973. The casts of his summer revues included actors such as Ulf Pilgaard, Per Pallesen, Marguerite Viby and Dirch Passer. Passer had a stroke during a performance in the Glass Hall on 3 September 1980 and died in the ambulance. Stentoft retired shortly thereafter. Klaus Pagh then served as artistic director of the Tivoli Revue from 1981 to 1987. The building was refurbished in 1998.

The Tivoli Revue was revived in 2003 in a partnership with the Dr. Dante Theatre. In 2004, it changed its name to Tivoli Varieté with Søren Østergård as artistic director.

== Repertoire ==
Each year in December, the Glass Gall Theatre plays host to London Toast Theatre's Crazy Christmas Cabaret.
