= Linger Awhile =

Studio album by Samara Joy
- Released: September 16, 2022
- Studio: Sear Sound, New York City, US
- Genre: Jazz
- Length: 41:14
- Label: Verve
- Producer: Matt Pierson

Samara Joy chronology
Samara Joy (2021)	Linger Awhile (2022)	A Joyful Holiday (2023)

Linger Awhile is the second studio album by American jazz singer Samara Joy. The title track is the perennial jazz and pop tune from 1923 by Vincent Rose and Harry Owens. The album was released on September 16, 2022, through Verve Records. It was produced by Matt Pierson. The album won the Grammy Award for Best Jazz Vocal Album and was responsible for Joy also winning Best New Artist at the 65th Annual Grammy Awards.

Following Joy's wins, the album reached number 158 on the US Billboard 200 and reached number one on the Jazz Albums chart with 8,500 album-equivalent units.

== Critical reception ==
Professional ratings
Review scores
Source	Rating
All About Jazz	4/5 stars
AllMusic	4/5 stars
Jazzwise	4/5 stars
Tom Hull	B+

Peter Moore of Jazzwise called Linger Awhile a "staggeringly fine album", noting "Guess Who I Saw Today" as a standout, and remarked on the "outstanding support from guitarist Pasquale Grasso, pianist Ben Paterson, bassist David Wong and drummer Kenny Washington" on the title track. Moore also called Joy's version of "'Round Midnight" a "wondrous take" and praised the "incredibly beautiful timbre" of her voice on "Someone to Watch Over Me". Veronica Johnson of JazzTimes found "much to be admired" and a "musical maturation" on the album, writing that it is a "nostalgic stroll through well-known and obscure standards" with a "mixing of swing and sweet tunes", complimenting "the romantic feel [Joy] infuses into songs".

Angelo Leonardi of All About Jazz commended Joy's partnership with guitarist Pasquale Grasso, opining that it is "inspiring" and "stands out" on "Someone to Watch Over Me", and felt that Joy "confirms all the good things that have been said about her: unusual interpretative maturity for her age, fresh chromatic variety, creative flair, [and] intense feeling", naming Linger Awhile album of the week.

== Track listing ==
Linger Awhile track listing
No.	Title	Writer(s)	Length
1.	"Can't Get Out of This Mood"	Frank Loesser; Jimmy McHugh	3:42
2.	"Guess Who I Saw Today"	Elisse Boyd; Murray Grand	4:09
3.	"Nostalgia (The Day I Knew)"	Fats Navarro; Samara Joy	3:30
4.	"Sweet Pumpkin" (featuring Pasquale Grasso)	Ronnell Bright	3:54
5.	"Misty"	Erroll Garner; Johnny Burke	4:54
6.	"Social Call"	Gigi Gryce; Jon Hendricks	4:30
7.	"I'm Confessin' (That I Love You)"	Al Neiburg; Doc Daugherty; Ellis Reynolds	5:04
8.	"Linger Awhile" (featuring Pasquale Grasso)	Harry Owens; Vincent Rose	1:47
9.	"'Round Midnight"	Thelonious Monk; Bernard Hanighen; Cootie Williams	5:42
10.	"Someone to Watch Over Me" (featuring Pasquale Grasso)	George Gershwin; Ira Gershwin	4:02
Total length:			41:14

== Personnel ==
- Samara Joy – vocals
- Chris Allen – recording, mixing
- Sampson Alvarado – recording assistance
- Donovan Austin – trombone
- Will Bennett – recording assistance
- Pasquale Grasso – guitar
- Kendric McCallister – tenor saxophone, arrangements
- Ben Paterson – piano
- Matt Pierson – producer
- Ryan Rogers – creative direction, design
- Terell Stafford – trumpet, flugelhorn
- Meredith Truax – photography
- Kenny Washington – drums
- David Wong – double bass
- Mark Wilder – mastering

== Charts ==
Chart performance for Linger Awhile
Chart (2023)	Peak position
Australian Jazz & Blues Albums (ARIA)	4
French Albums (SNEP)	180
French Jazz Albums (SNEP)	2
Japanese Digital Albums (Oricon)	26
Japanese Hot Albums (Billboard Japan)	38
Scottish Albums (Official Charts)	78
Swiss Albums (Schweizer Hitparade)	37
UK Album Downloads (Official Charts)	14
UK Jazz & Blues Albums (Official Charts)	1
US Billboard 200	158
US Jazz Albums (Billboard)	1

== Release history ==
Release history and formats for Linger Awhile
Region	Date	Format	Label	Ref.
United States	September 16, 2022	CD; vinyl LP	Verve Records	
Various	September 16, 2022	CD; digital download; streaming	Verve Records	
