= Theater (structure) =

Performing arts venue (building)

The interior of the Palais Garnier, an opera house, showing the stage and auditorium, the latter including the floor seats and the opera boxes above

A theater, theatre or playhouse, is a structure where theatrical works, performing arts, and musical concerts are presented. The theater building serves to define the performance and audience spaces. The facility usually is organized to provide support areas for performers, the technical crew and the audience members, as well as the stage where the performance takes place.

There are as many types of theaters as there are types of performance. Theaters may be built specifically for certain types of productions, they may serve for more general performance needs or they may be adapted or converted for use as a theater. They may range from open-air amphitheaters to ornate, cathedral-like structures to simple, undecorated rooms or black box theaters. A thrust stage as well as an arena stage are just a few more examples of the multitude of stages where plays can occur. A theatre used for opera performances is called an opera house. A theater is not required for performance (as in environmental theater or street theater), this article is about structures used specifically for performance. Some theaters may have a fixed acting area (in most theaters this is known as the stage), while some theaters, such as black box theaters have movable seating allowing the production to create a performance area suitable for the production.

== Elements of a theater building ==
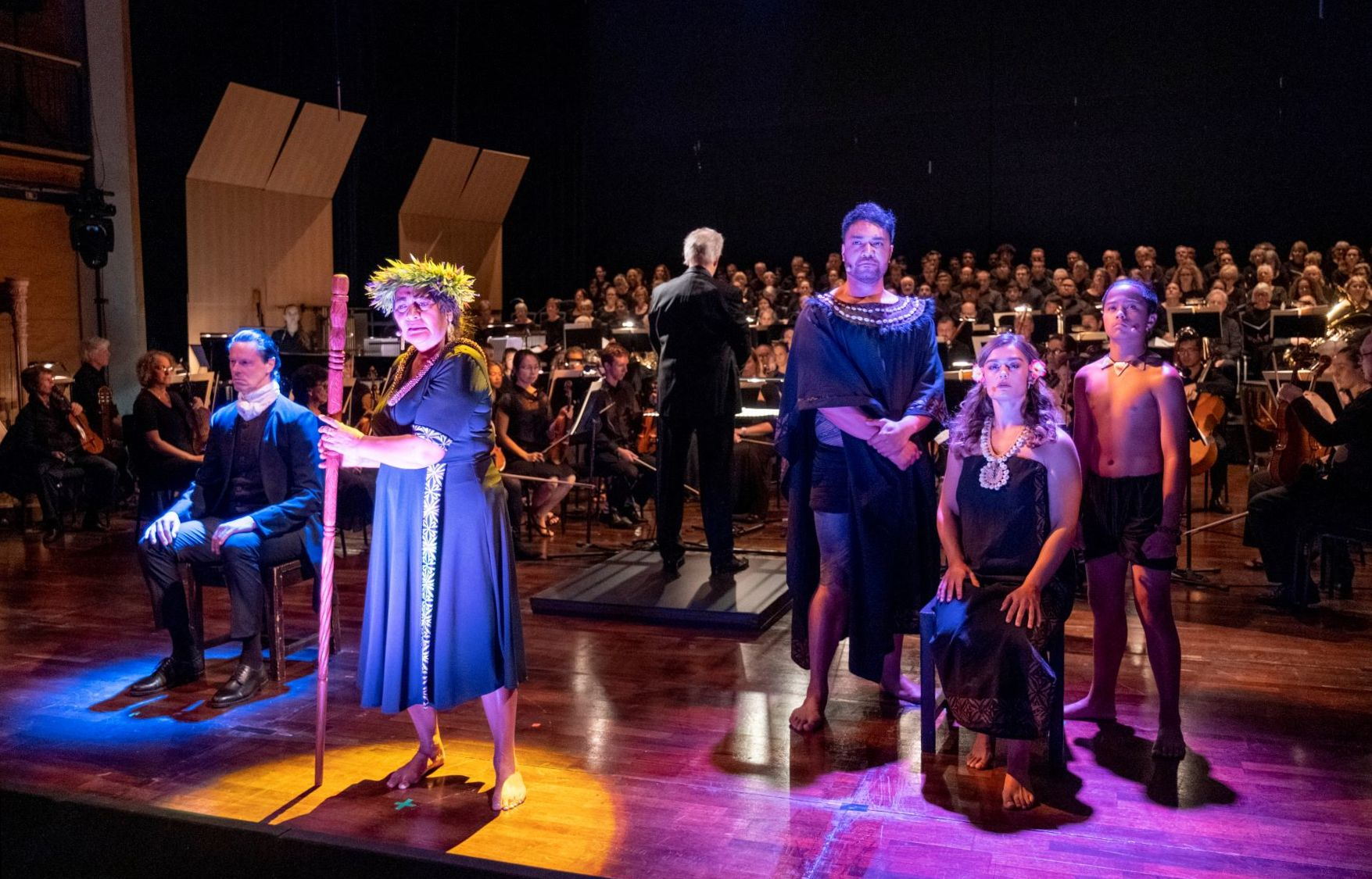
An opera production of Ihitai 'Avei'a – Star Navigator at a 'block box' events centre in Auckland, New Zealand

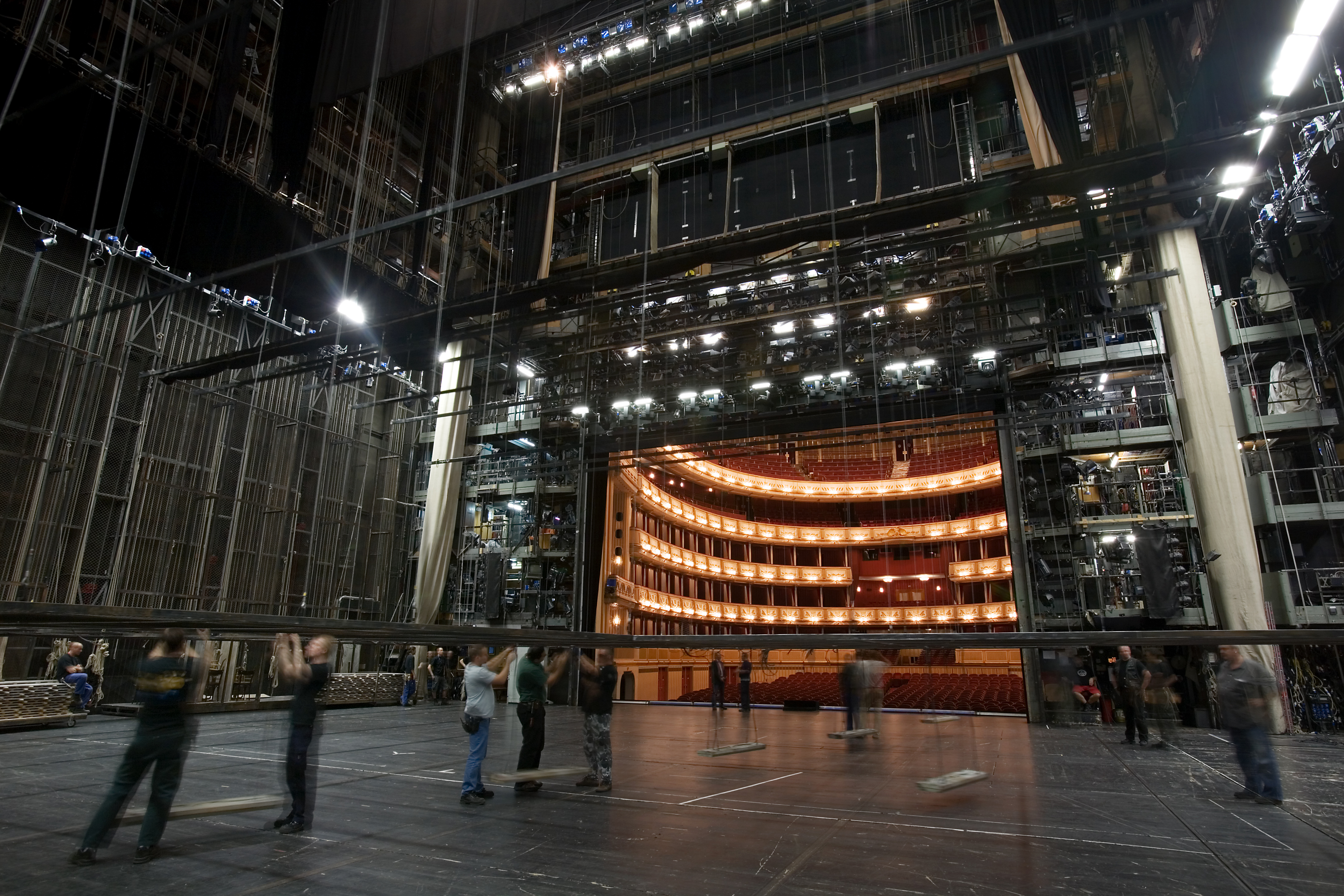
Backstage area of the Vienna State Opera

A theater building or structure contains spaces for an event or performance to take place, usually called the stage, and also spaces for the audience, theater staff, performers and crew before and after the event.

There are usually two main entrances of a theater building. One is at the front, used by the audience, and leads into a foyer and ticketing. The second is called the stage door, and it is accessible from backstage. This is where the cast and crew enter and exit the theater, and there is a tradition called "stage dooring" that some fans participate in, in which fans wait outside of the stage door after the show in hopes of getting an autograph from the actors.

=== Stage ===
The acting or performance space is the stage. In some theaters, such as proscenium theaters, arena theaters and amphitheaters, this area is permanent part of the structure. In some theaters the stage area can be changed and adapted specifically to a production, often called a black box theater, due to the common practice of the walls being painted black and hung with black drapes.

=== Backstage and offstage ===
Usually in a building used specifically for performance there are offstage spaces used by the performers and crew. This is where props, sets, and scenery are stored, and the performers standby before their entrance. These offstage spaces are called wings on either side of a proscenium stage. A prompter's box may be found backstage. In an amphitheater, an area behind the stage may be designated for such uses while a blackbox theater may have spaces outside of the actual theater designated for such uses.

Often a theater will incorporate other spaces intended for the performers and other personnel. A booth facing the stage may be incorporated into the house where lighting and sound personnel may view the show and run their respective instruments. Other rooms in the building may be used for dressing rooms, rehearsal rooms, spaces for constructing sets (called a scene shop), props and costumes, as well as storage.

Backstage spaces in the wings can include spaces for prop and set piece storage, sound and lighting equipment, and a fly rail. A fly rail, or fly system, is a rigging system that allows many pipes to be lowered up and down on the stage using ropes. These pipes can have many different things on them, such as curtains, legs, lights, projector screens, acoustic clouds, and more.

=== Seating and audience ===
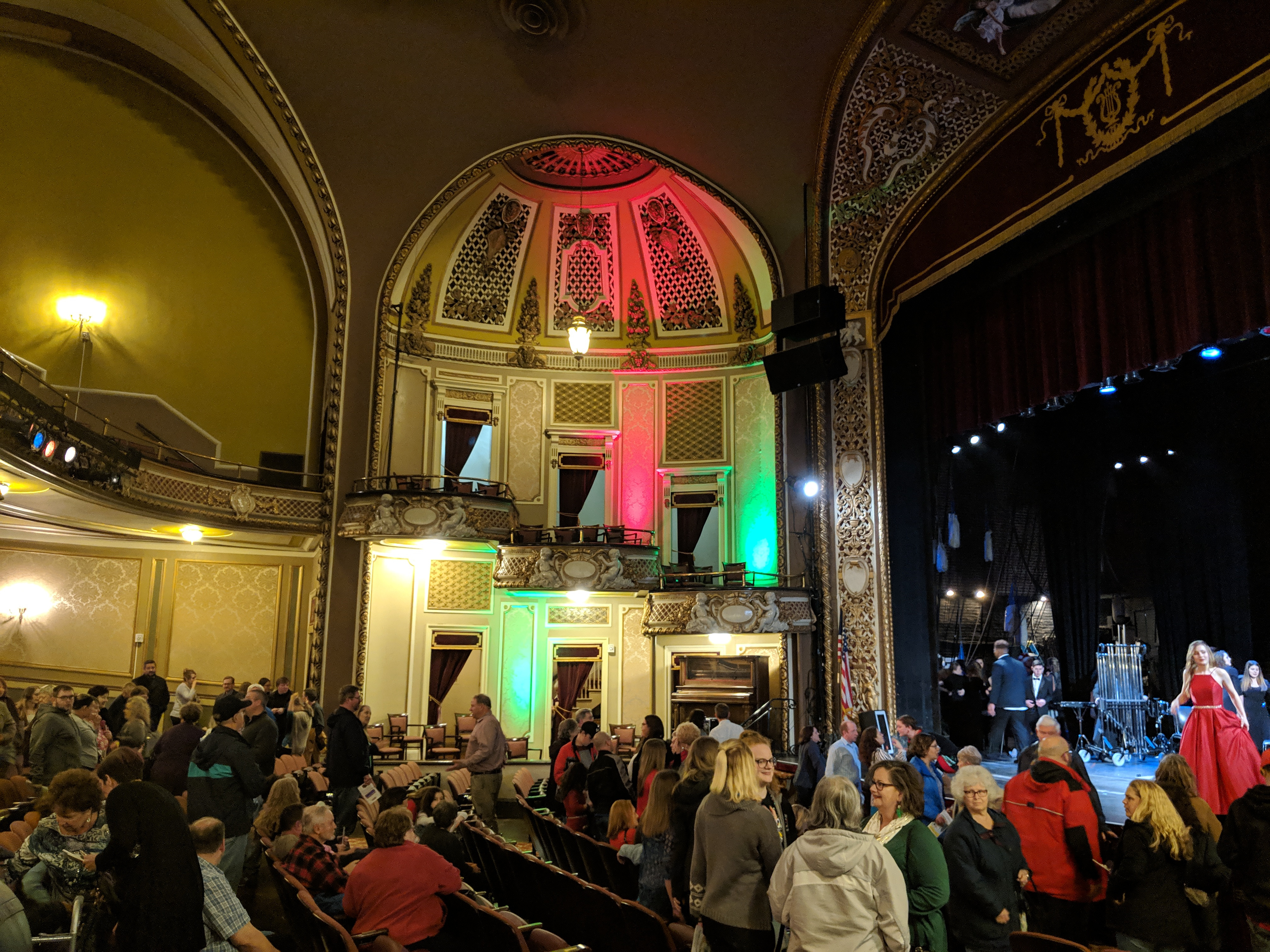
Maryland Theatre in Hagerstown, Maryland, showing the stage, proscenium and seating

All theaters provide a space for an audience. In a fixed seating theatre the audience is often separated from the performers by the proscenium arch. In proscenium theaters and amphitheaters, the proscenium arch, like the stage, is a permanent feature of the structure. This area is known as the auditorium or the house.

The seating areas can include some or all of the following:

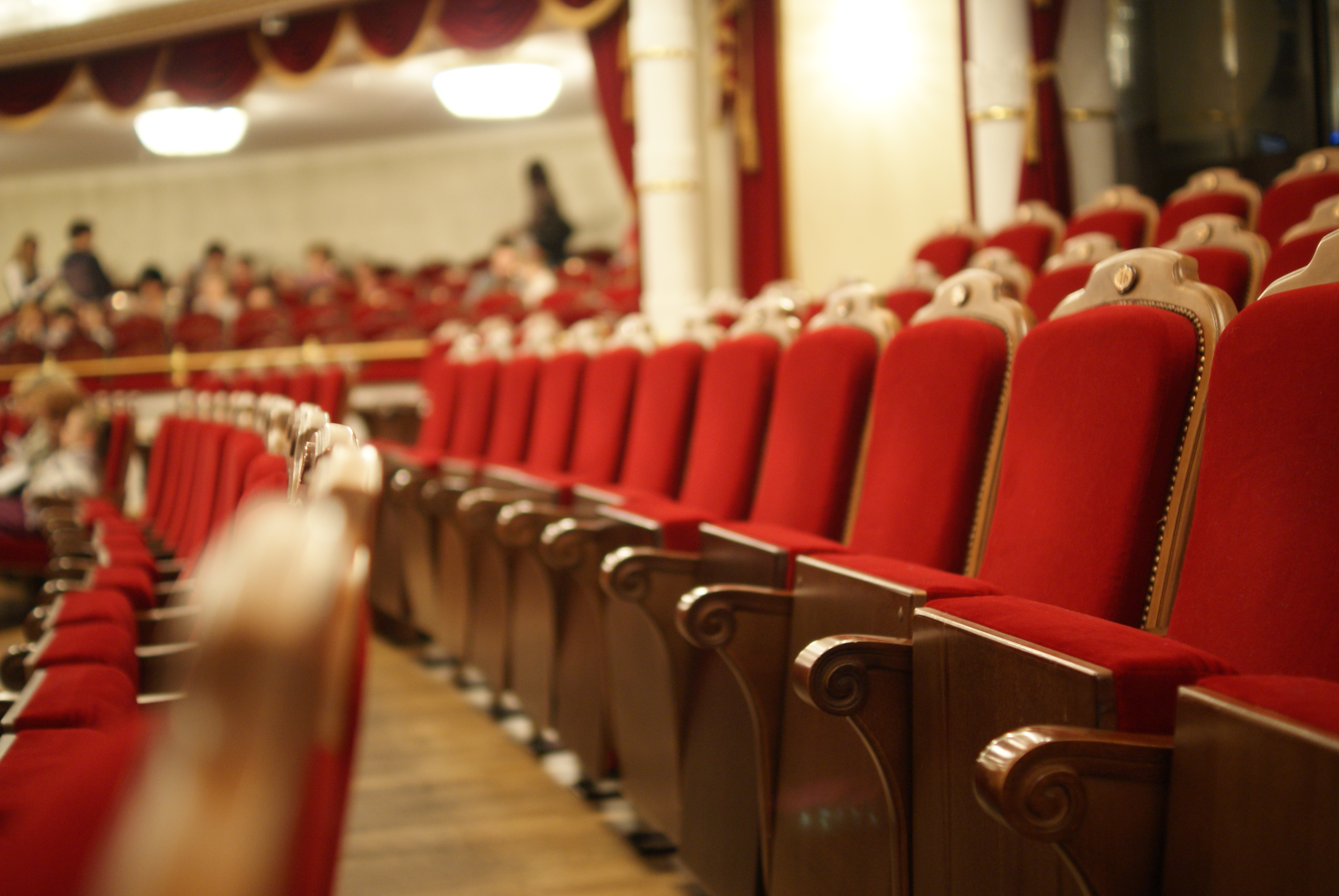
Close-up of the seats in the Opera and Ballet Theatre in Minsk

- Stalls or arena (in North America, "orchestra"): the lower flat area, usually below or at the same level as the stage. The word parterre (occasionally, parquet) is sometimes used to refer to a particular subset of this area. In North American usage this is usually the rear seating block beneath the gallery (see below) whereas in Britain it can mean either the area in front near the orchestra pit, or the whole of the stalls. The term can also refer to the side stalls in some usages. Derived from the gardening term parterre, the usage refers to the sectioned pattern of both the seats of an auditorium and of the planted beds seen in garden construction. Throughout the 18th century the term was also used to refer to the theater audience who occupied the parterre.
- Balconies or galleries: one or more raised seating platforms towards the rear of the auditorium. In larger theaters, multiple levels are stacked vertically above or behind the stalls. The first level is usually called the dress circle or grand circle. The next level may be the loge, from the French version of loggia. A second tier inserted beneath the main balcony may be the mezzanine. The highest platform, or upper circle, is sometimes known as "the gods", especially in large opera houses, where the seats can be very high and a long distance from the stage.
- Boxes (state box or stage box): typically placed immediately to the front, side and above the level of the stage. They are often separate rooms with an open viewing area which typically seat up to five people. These seats are typically considered the most prestigious of the house. A "state box" or "royal box" is sometimes provided for dignitaries.
- House seats: these are "the best seats in the house", giving the best view of the stage. Though each theater's layout is different, these are usually in the center of the stalls. These seats are traditionally reserved for the cast and crew to invite family members, agents, and others. If they are not used, they usually go on sale on the day of the performance.

== History ==
=== Open-air theaters ===
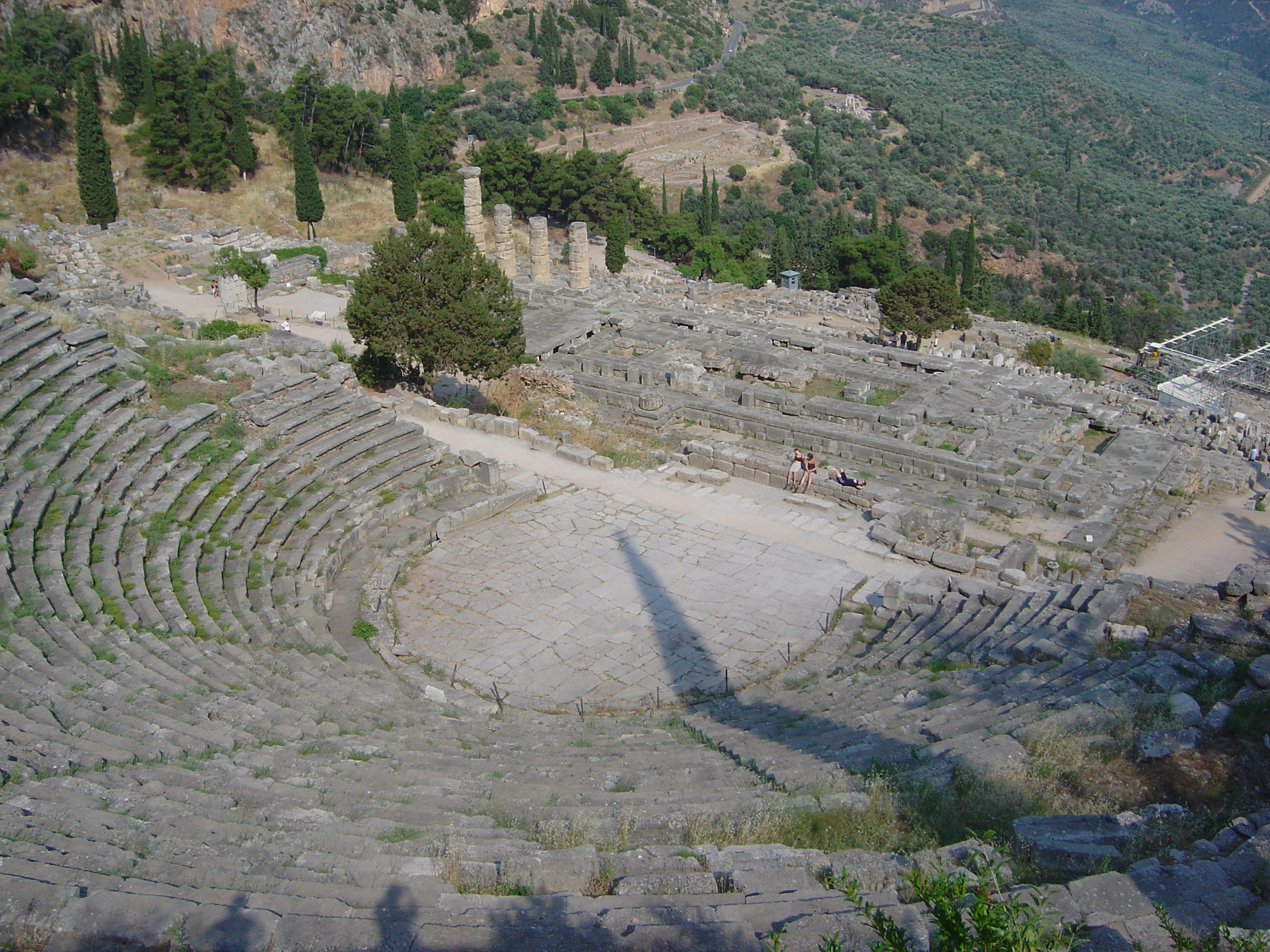
The ancient theater in Delphi, Greece

==== Ancient Greece ====
Greek theater buildings were called a theatron ('seeing place'). The theaters were large, open-air structures constructed on the slopes of hills. They consisted of three principal elements: the orchestra, the skene, and the audience.

The centerpiece of the theater was the orchestra, or "dancing place", a large circular or rectangular area. The orchestra was the site of the choral performances, the religious rites, and, possibly, the acting. An altar was located in the middle of the orchestra; in Athens, the altar was dedicated to Dionysus, the god of wine and the theater.

Behind the orchestra was a large rectangular building called the skene (meaning "tent" or "hut"). It was used as a "backstage" area where actors could change their costumes and masks, but also served to represent the location of the plays, which were usually set in front of a palace or house. Typically, there were two or three doors in the skene that led out onto orchestra, and from which actors could enter and exit. At first, the skene was literally a tent or hut, put up for the religious festival and taken down when it was finished. Later, the skene became a permanent stone structure. These structures were sometimes painted to serve as backdrops, hence the English word scenery. A temple nearby, especially on the right side of the scene, is almost always part of the Greek theater complex, which could justify, as a transposition, the recurrence of the pediment with the later solidified stone scene.

In front of the skene there may have been a raised acting area called the proskenion, the ancestor of the modern proscenium stage. It is believed that the actors (as opposed to the chorus) acted entirely on the proskenion, but this is not certain.

Rising from the circle of the orchestra was the audience. The audience sat on tiers of benches built up on the side of a hill. Greek theaters, then, could only be built on hills that were correctly shaped. A typical theater was enormous, able to seat around 15,000 viewers.

Greek theaters were not enclosed; the audience could see each other and the surrounding countryside as well as the actors and chorus.

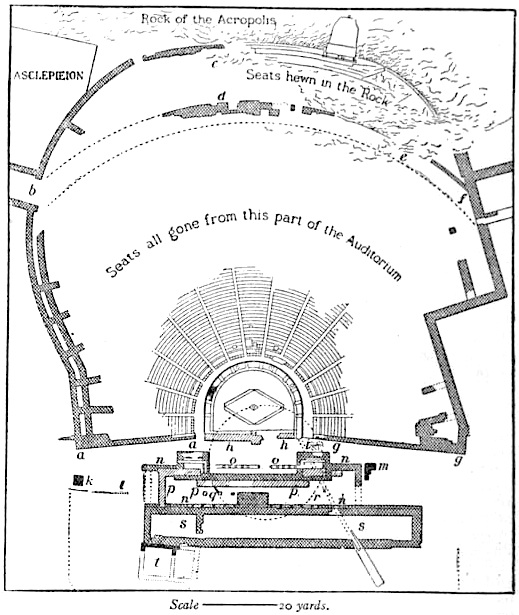
The Theatre at Athens; From Dorpfeld and Reisch, Das griechische Theater (Athens, 1896), as presented in the article on "Theatre" from the 1911 edition of Encyclopædia Britannica.
ab,	double western wall.
bc,	single wall.
aa, gg,	walls terminating wings of auditorium.
b, f,	entrances.
c,	the "katatome" (where the rock of the Acropolis was met by the walls).
d, e,	diazoma.
fg,	eastern boundary wall.
hh,	front wall of Neronian stage.
i,	fragment 5th-century orchestra.
klm,	ancient masonry (? of supporting walls).
nn,	oldest stage buildings.
oo,	stone proscenium (1st or 2nd century b.c.).
p,	foundations of Neronian side wings.
qr,	fragments 5th-century orchestra.
s,	4th-century portico.
t,	old Dionysus temple.

==== Ancient Rome ====
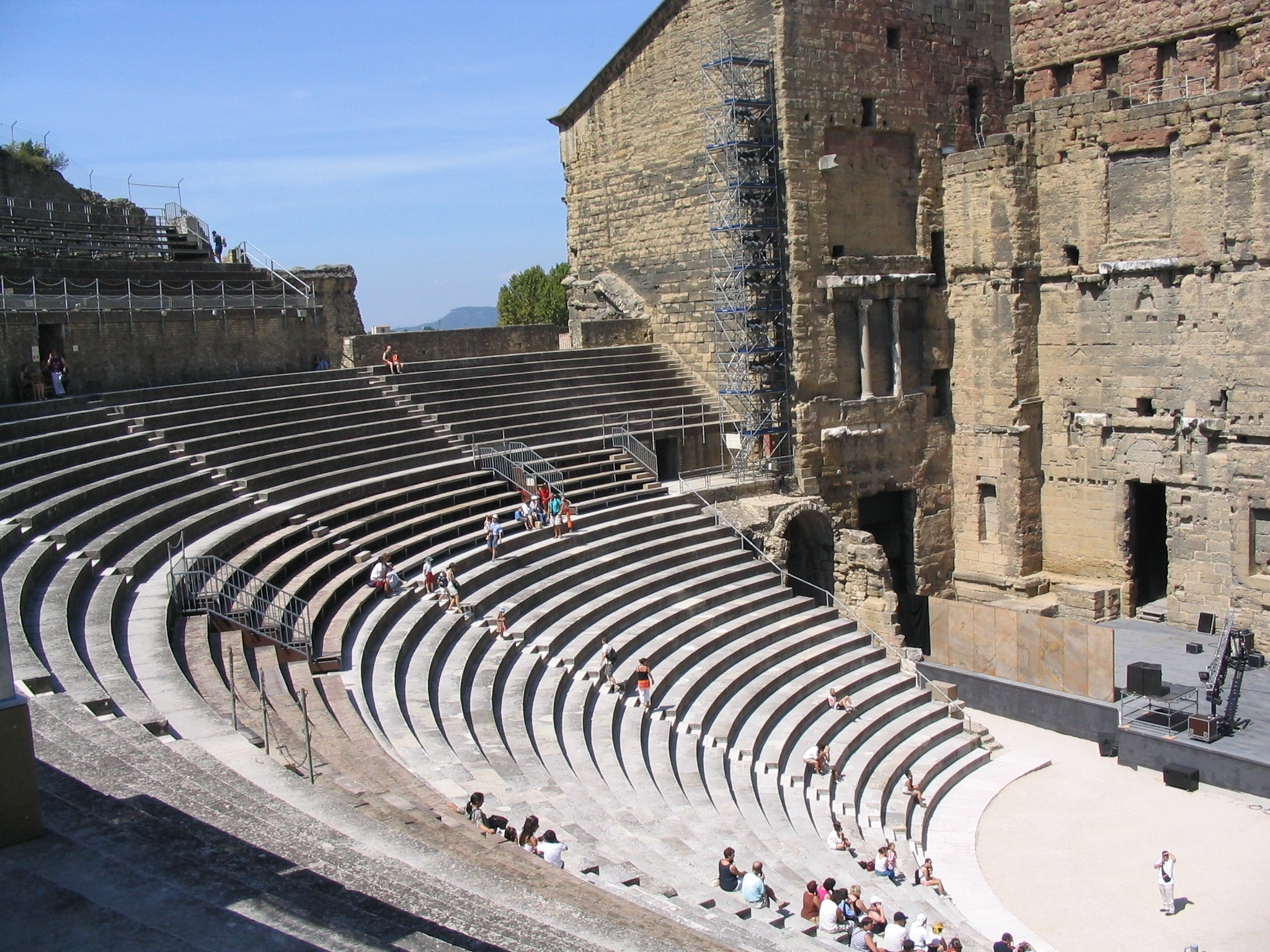
Roman Theater, Orange, France

The Romans copied the Greek style of building, but tended not to be so concerned about the location, being prepared to build walls and terraces instead of looking for a naturally occurring site.

The auditorium (literally "place for hearing" in Latin) was the area in which people gathered, and was sometimes constructed on a small hill or slope in which stacked seating could be easily made in the tradition of the Greek Theatres. The central part of the auditorium was hollowed out of a hill or slope, while the outer radian seats required structural support and solid retaining walls. This was of course not always the case as Romans tended to build their theatres regardless of the availability of hillsides. All theatres built within the city of Rome were completely man-made without the use of earthworks. The auditorium was not roofed; rather, awnings (vela) could be pulled overhead to provide shelter from rain or sunlight.

Some Roman theatres, constructed of wood, were torn down after the festival for which they were erected concluded. This practice was due to a moratorium on permanent theatre structures that lasted until 55 BC when the Theatre of Pompey was built with the addition of a temple to avoid the law. Some Roman theatres show signs of never having been completed in the first place.

Inside Rome, few theatres have survived the centuries following their construction, providing little evidence about the specific theatres. Arausio, the theatre in modern-day Orange, France, is a good example of a classic Roman theatre, with an indented scaenae frons, reminiscent of Western Roman theatre designs, however missing the more ornamental structure. The Arausio is still standing today and, with its amazing structural acoustics and having had its seating reconstructed, can be seen to be a marvel of Roman architecture.

==== Elizabethan England ====
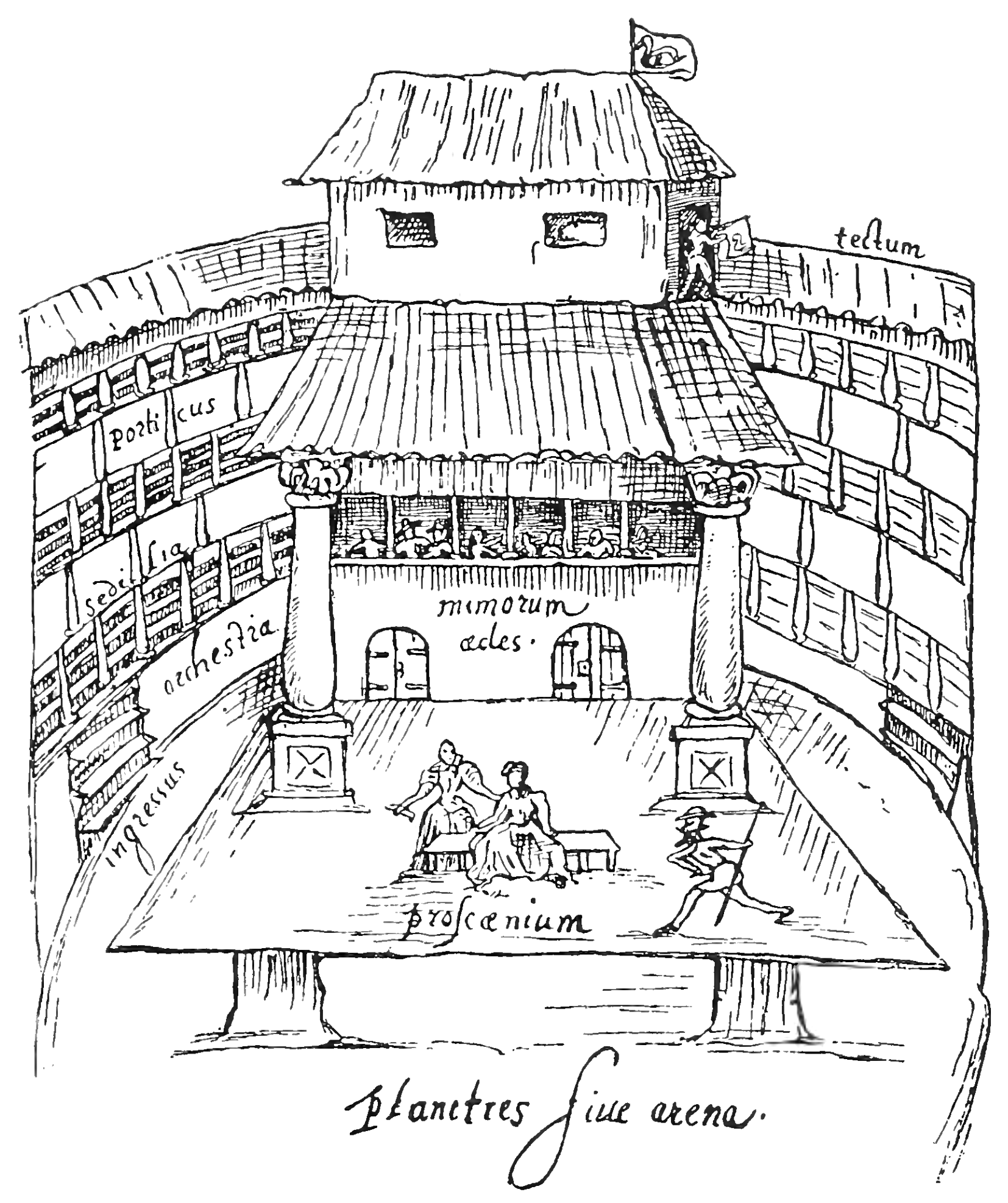
1596 illustration of Swan Theatre, Southwark, London, showing round structure

During the Elizabethan era in England, theaters were constructed of wooden framing, infilled with wattle and daub and roofed with thatch. Mostly the theaters were entirely open air. They consisted of several floors of covered galleries surrounding a courtyard which was open to the elements. A large portion of the audience would stand in the yard, directly in front of the stage. This layout is said to derive from the practice of holding plays in the yard of an inn. Archaeological excavations of The Rose theater at London's Bankside, built 1587, have shown that it had en external diameter of 72 feet (22 metres). The nearby Globe Theatre (1599) was larger, at 100 feet (30 metres). Other evidence for the round shape is a line in Shakespeare's Henry V which calls the building "this wooden O", and several rough woodcut illustrations of the city of London.

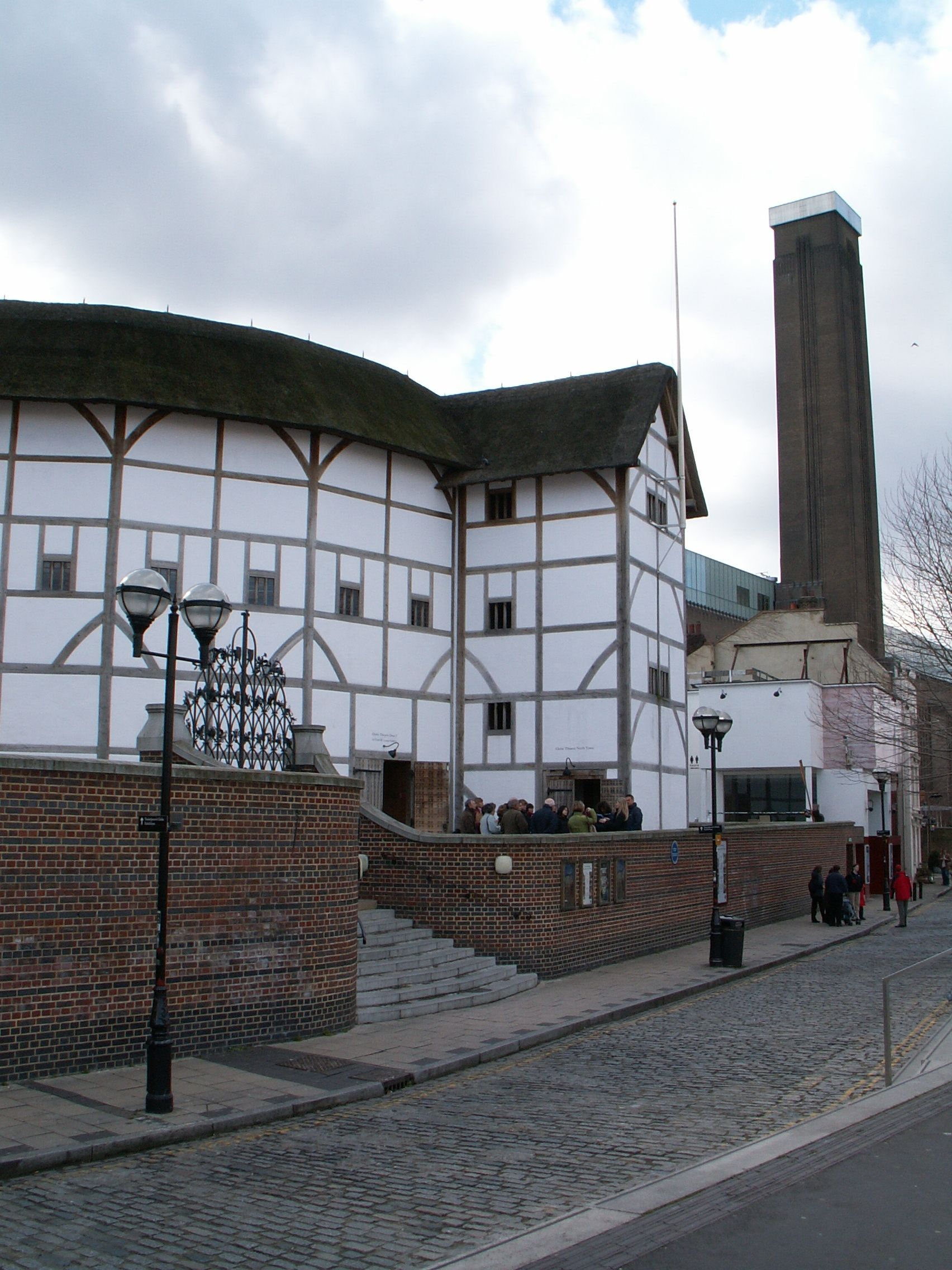
Recreation of Shakespeare's Globe Theatre in London

Around this time, the green room, a place for actors to wait until required on stage, became common terminology in English theaters.

The Globe has now been rebuilt as a fully working and producing theater near its original site (largely thanks to the efforts of film director Sam Wanamaker) to give modern audiences an idea of the environment for which Shakespeare and other playwrights of the period were writing.

=== Indoor theaters ===
==== Renaissance Europe ====
During the Renaissance, the first modern enclosed theaters were constructed in Italy. Their structure was similar to that of ancient theaters, with a cavea and an architectural scenery, representing a city street. The oldest surviving examples of this style are the Teatro Olimpico in Vicenza (1580) and the Teatro all'antica in Sabbioneta (1590).

At the beginning of 17th century theaters had moved indoors and began to resemble the arrangement we see most frequently today, with a stage separated from the audience by a proscenium arch. This coincided with a growing interest in scenic elements painted in perspective, such as those created by Inigo Jones, Nicola Sabbatini and the Galli da Bibiena family. The perspective of these elements could only be viewed properly from the center back of the auditorium, in the so-called "duke's chair." The higher one's status, the closer they would be seated to this vantage point, and the more the accurately they would be able to see the perspective elements.

The first enclosed theaters were court theaters, open only to the sovereigns and the nobility. The first opera house open to the public was the Teatro San Cassiano (1637) in Venice. The Italian opera houses were the model for the subsequent theaters throughout Europe.

==== German operatic influence ====
Richard Wagner placed great importance on "mood setting" elements, such as a darkened theater, sound effects, and seating arrangements (lowering the orchestra pit) which focused the attention of audience on the stage, completely immersing them in the imaginary world of the music drama. These concepts were revolutionary at the time, but they have since come to be taken for granted in the modern operatic environment as well as many other types of theatrical endeavors.

==== Contemporary theaters ====
Contemporary theaters are often non-traditional, such as very adaptable spaces, or theaters where audience and performers are not separated. A major example of this is the modular theater, notably the Walt Disney Modular Theater. This large theater has floors and walls divided into small movable sections, with the floor sections on adjustable pneumatric piston, so that the space may be adjusted into any configuration for each individual play. As new styles of theater performance have evolved, so has the desire to improve or recreate performance venues. This applies equally to artistic and presentation techniques, such as stage lighting.

Specific designs of contemporary live theaters include proscenium, thrust, black box theater, theater in the round, amphitheater, and arena. In the classical Indian dance, Natya Shastra defines three stage types. In Australia and New Zealand a small and simple theater, particularly one contained within a larger venue, is called a theatrette. The word originated in 1920s London, for a small-scale music venue.

Theatrical performances can also take place in venues adapted from other purposes, such as train carriages. For instance, in recent years the Edinburgh Fringe has seen performances in an taxi.

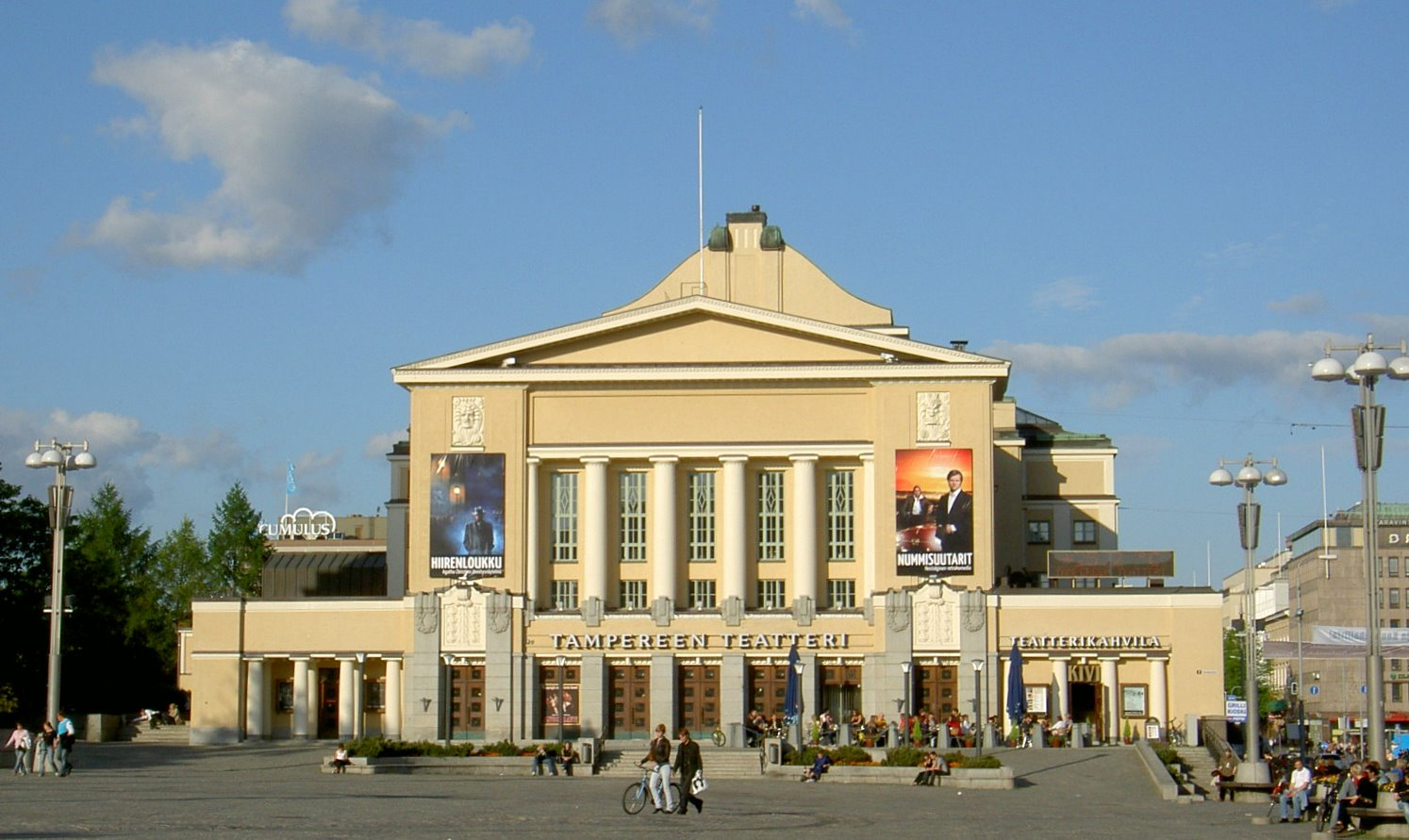
The Tampere Theatre in Tampere, Finland

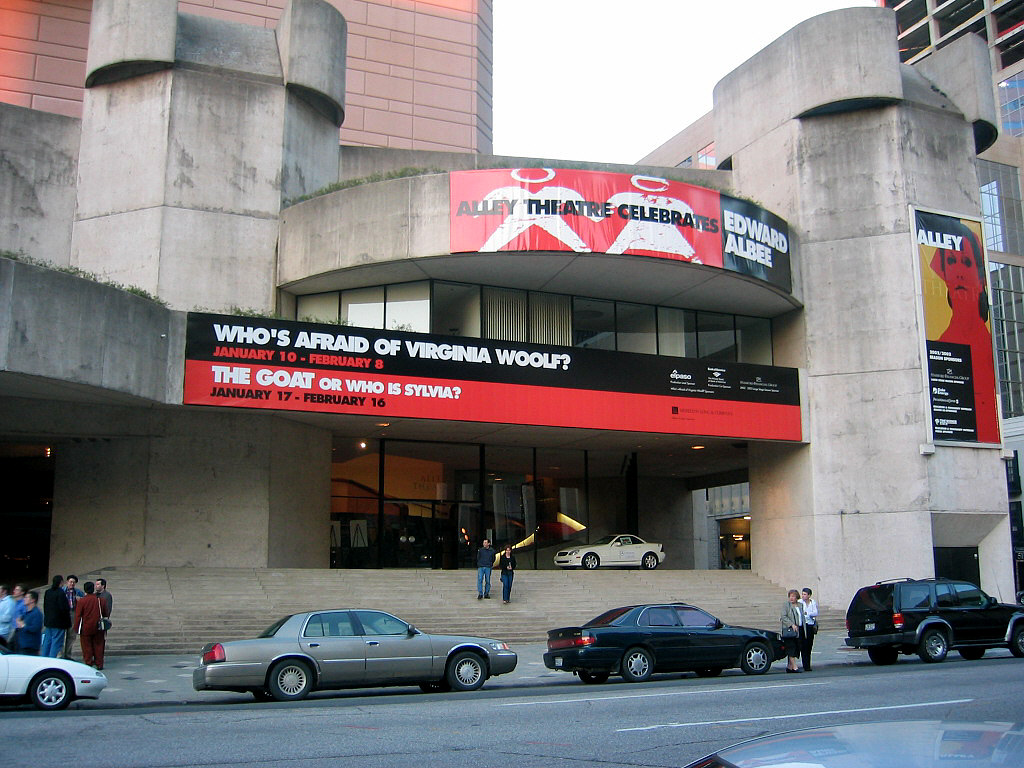
The Alley Theatre, home to the Alley Theatre Company, Houston, Texas

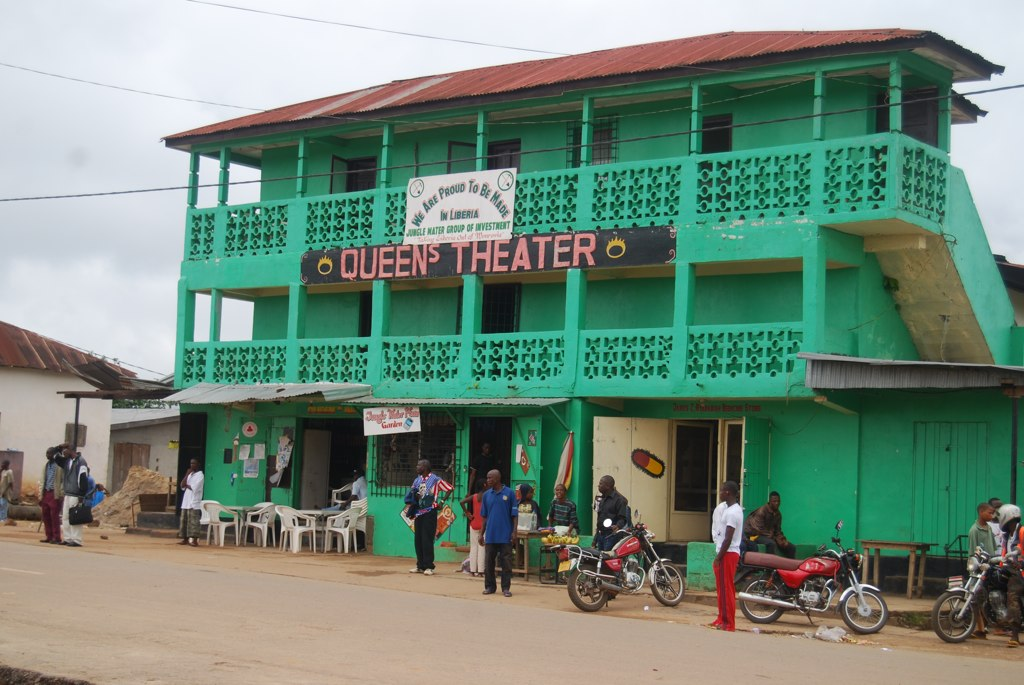
Queen's Theater (Ganta, Liberia)

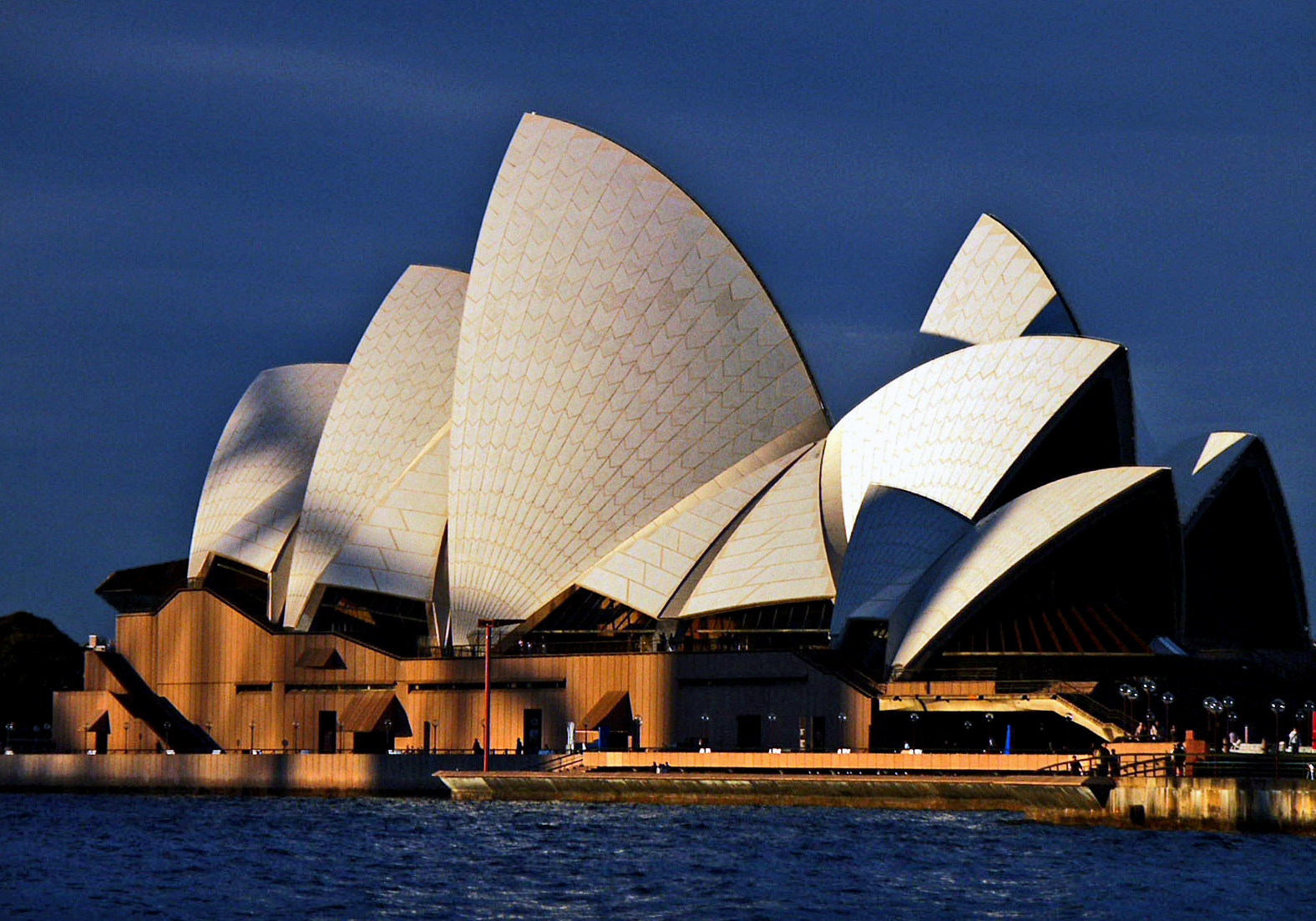
The Sydney Opera House

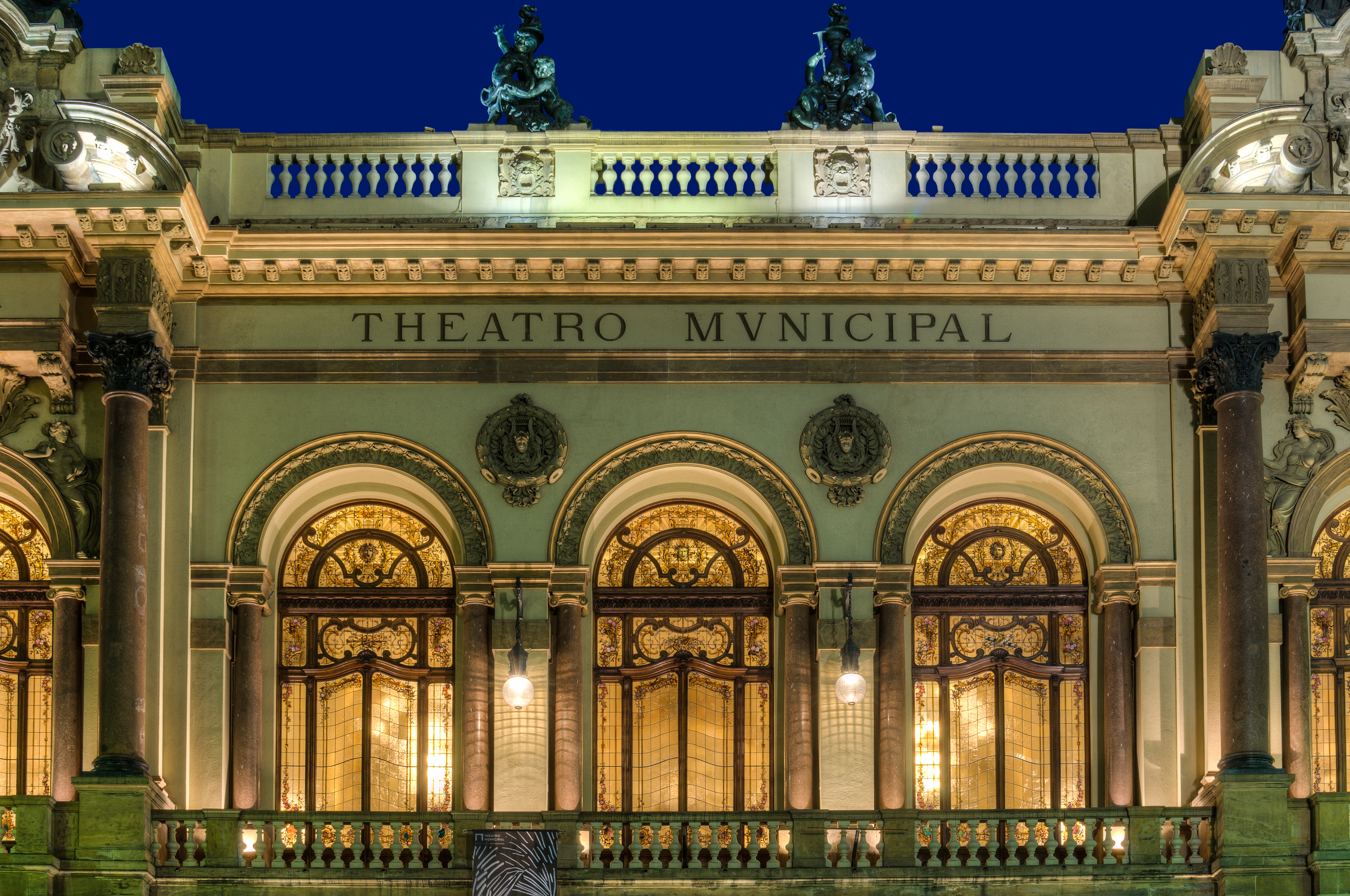
Theatre of São Paulo

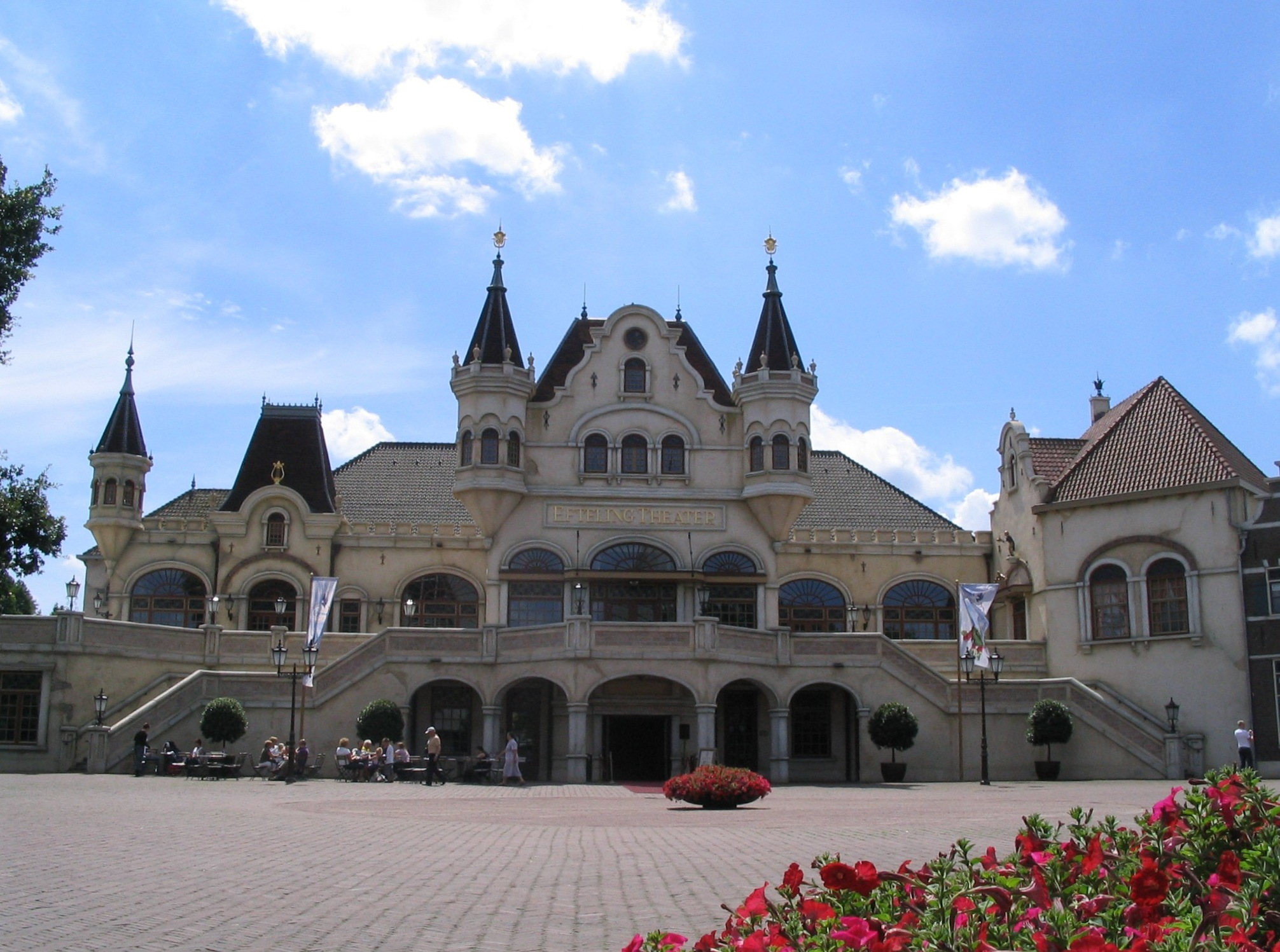
Efteling Theatre in Kaatsheuvel, The Netherlands

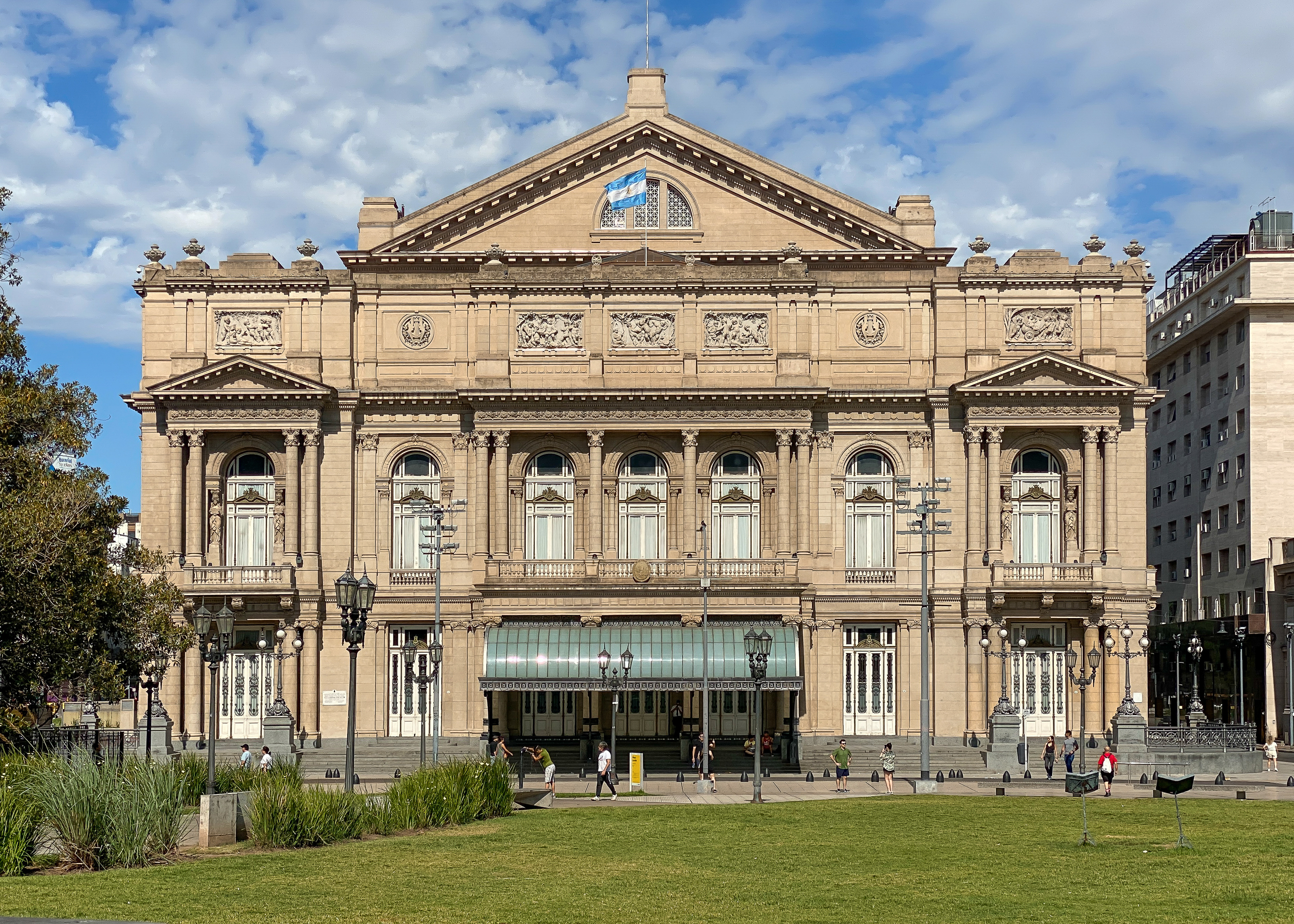
Teatro Colón in Buenos Aires, Argentina

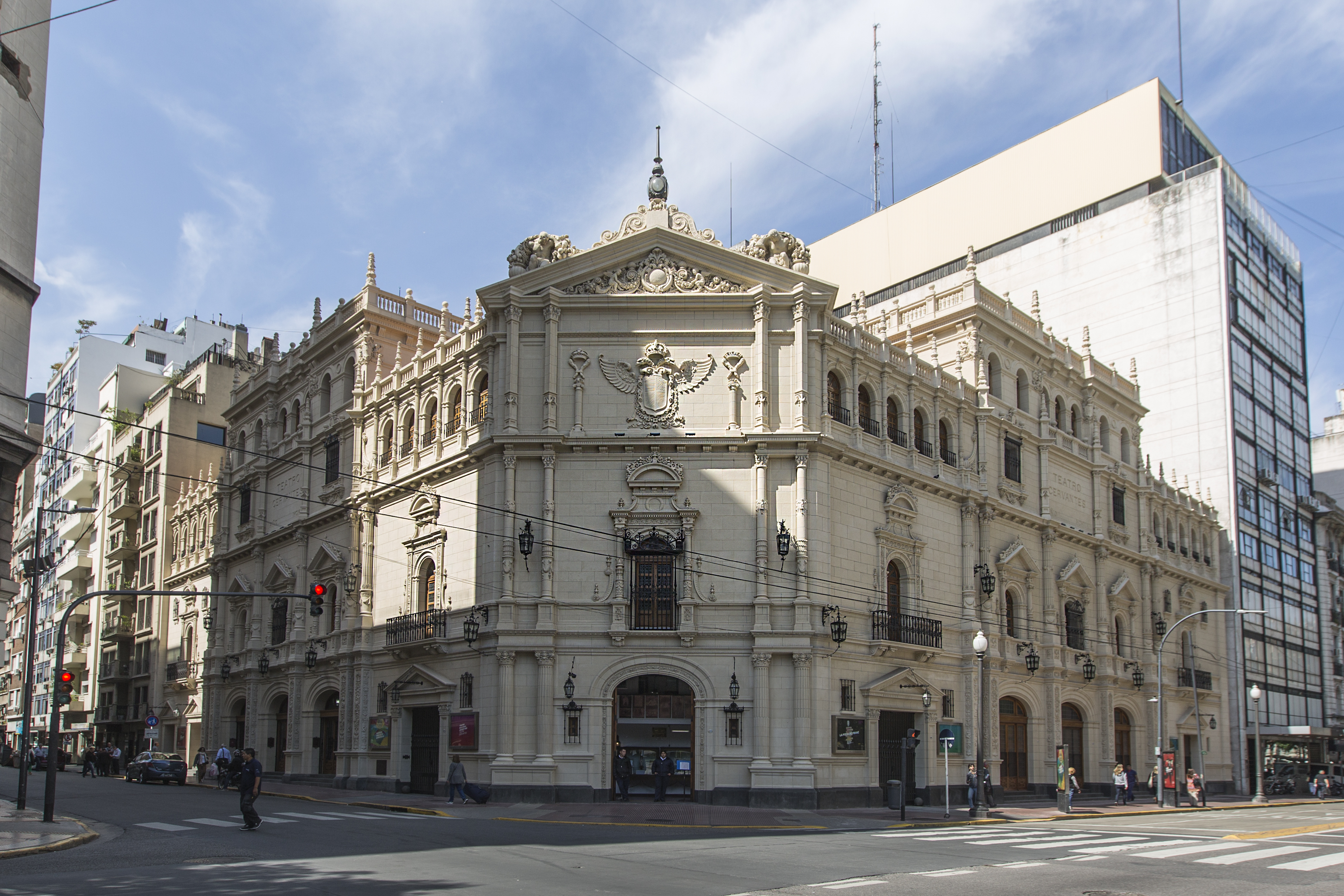
Teatro Nacional Cervantes in Buenos Aires, Argentina

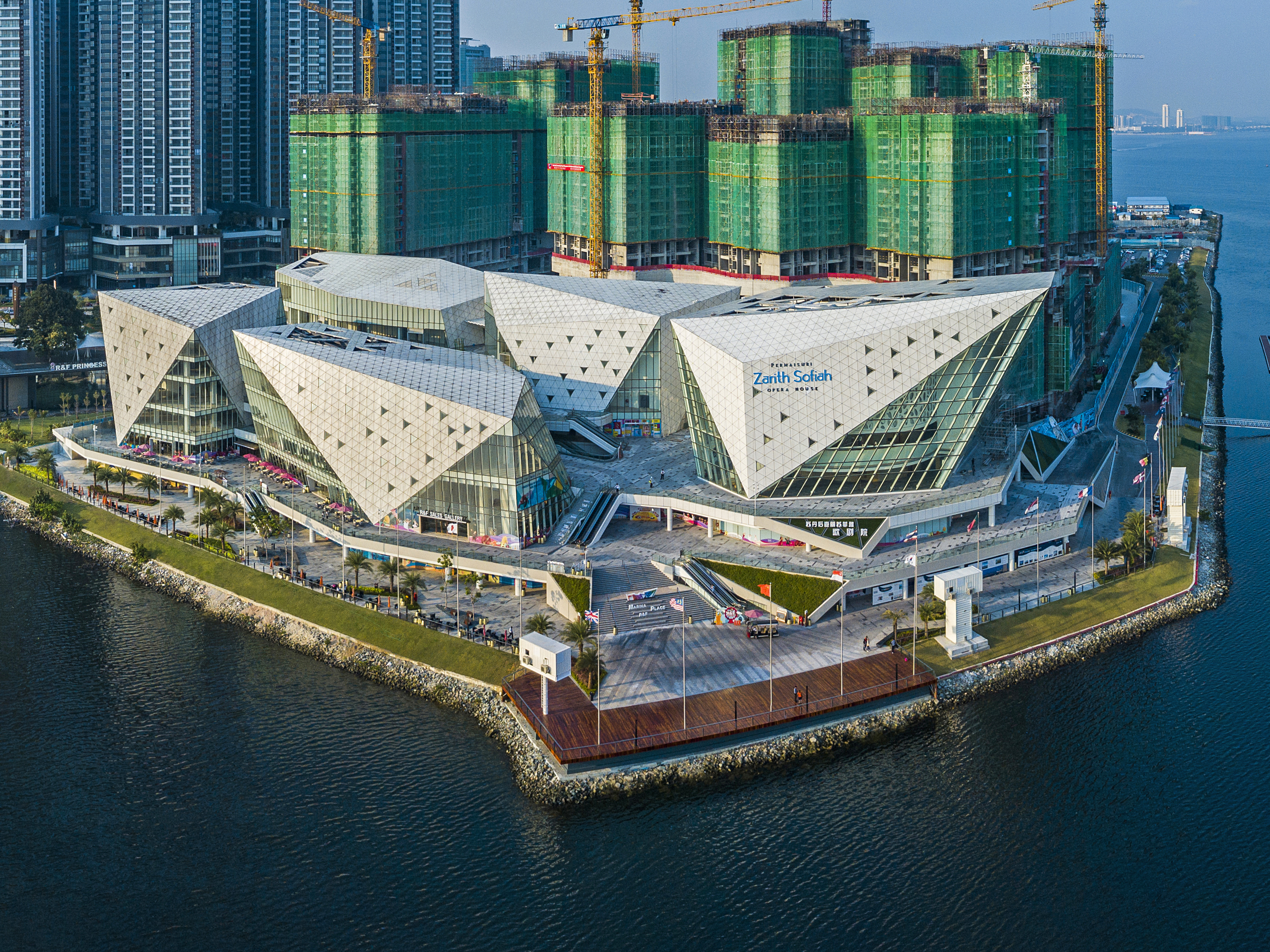
Permaisuri Zarith Sofiah Opera House in Johor Bahru, Malaysia

== Asian theater design ==
=== Noh ===
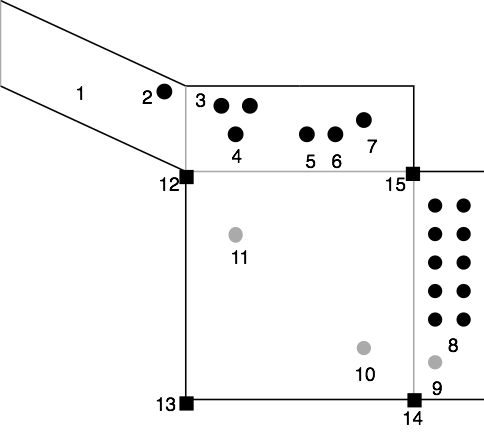
1: hashigakari (bridgeway) 2: kyōgen spot. 3: stage attendants. 4: stick drum. 5: hip drum. 6: shoulder drum. 7: flute. 8: chorus. 9: waki seat. 10: waki spot (opposite to main actor) 11: shite spot ( main actor) 12: shite-bashira (main actor pillar) 13: metsuke-bashira (guide pillar) 14: waki-bashira (opposite shite actor pillar) 15: fue-bashira (flute pillar)

The traditional stage used in Noh theater is based on a Chinese pattern. It is completely open, providing a shared experience between the performers and the audience throughout the play. Without any prosceniums or curtains to obstruct the view, the audience sees each actor at moments even before entering the primary platform of the stage. The theater itself is considered symbolic and treated with reverence both by the performers and the audience.

The stage includes a large square platform, devoid of walls or curtains on three sides, and traditionally with a painting of a pine tree at the back. The platform is elevated above the place where the audience sits, which is covered in white gravel soil. The four stage corners are marked by cedar pillars, and the whole is topped by a roof, even when the Noh stage is erected indoors. A ceramic jar system under the stage amplifies the sounds of dancing during the performance. There is a small door to permit entry of the musicians and vocalists.

The independent roof is one of the most recognizable characteristic of the Noh stage. Supported by four columns, the roof symbolizes the sanctity of the stage, with its architectural design derived from the worship pavilion (haiden) or sacred dance pavilion (kaguraden) of Shinto shrines. The roof also unifies the theater space and defines the stage as an architectural entity.

The pillars supporting the roof are named shitebashira (principal character's pillar), metsukebashira (gazing pillar), wakibashira (secondary character's pillar), and fuebashira (flute pillar), clockwise from upstage right respectively. Each pillar is associated with the performers and their actions.

The stage is made entirely of unfinished hinoki, a Japanese cypress, with almost no decorative elements. The poet and novelist Toson Shimazaki writes that "on the stage of the Noh theater there are no sets that change with each piece. Neither is there a curtain. There is only a simple panel (kagami-ita) with a painting of a green pine tree. This creates the impression that anything that could provide any shading has been banished. To break such monotony and make something happen is no easy thing."

Another unique feature of the stage is the hashigakari, a narrow bridge at upstage right used by actors to enter the stage. Hashigakari means "suspension bridge", signifying something aerial that connects two separate worlds on a same level. The bridge symbolizes the mythic nature of Noh plays in which otherworldly ghosts and spirits frequently appear. In contrast, hanamichi in Kabuki theaters is literally a path (michi) that connects two spaces in a single world, thus has a completely different significance.

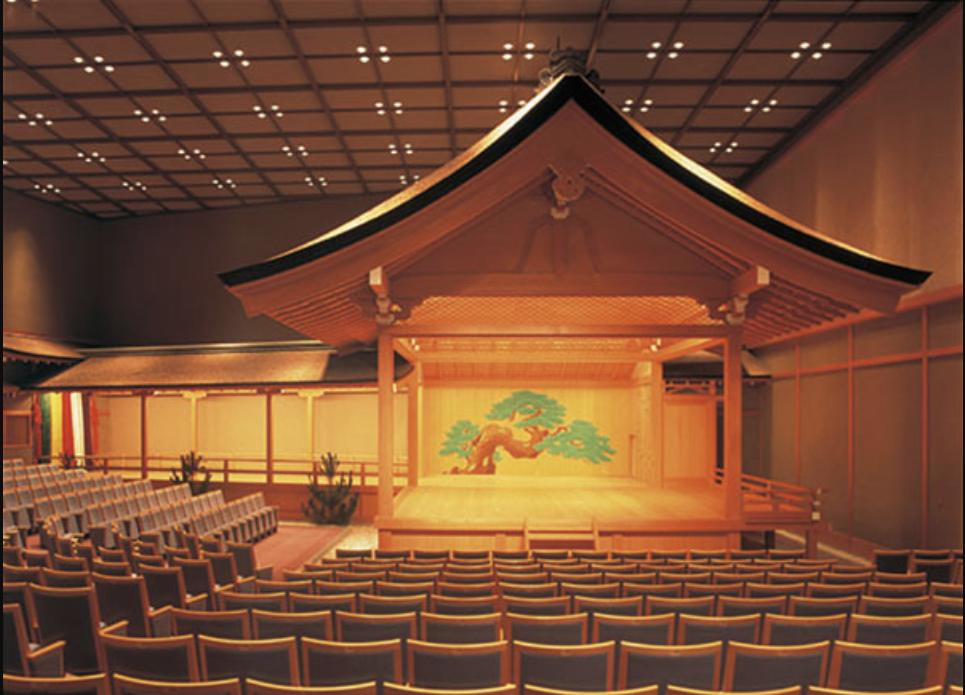
A contemporary Noh theatre with indoor roofed structure

=== Kabuki ===
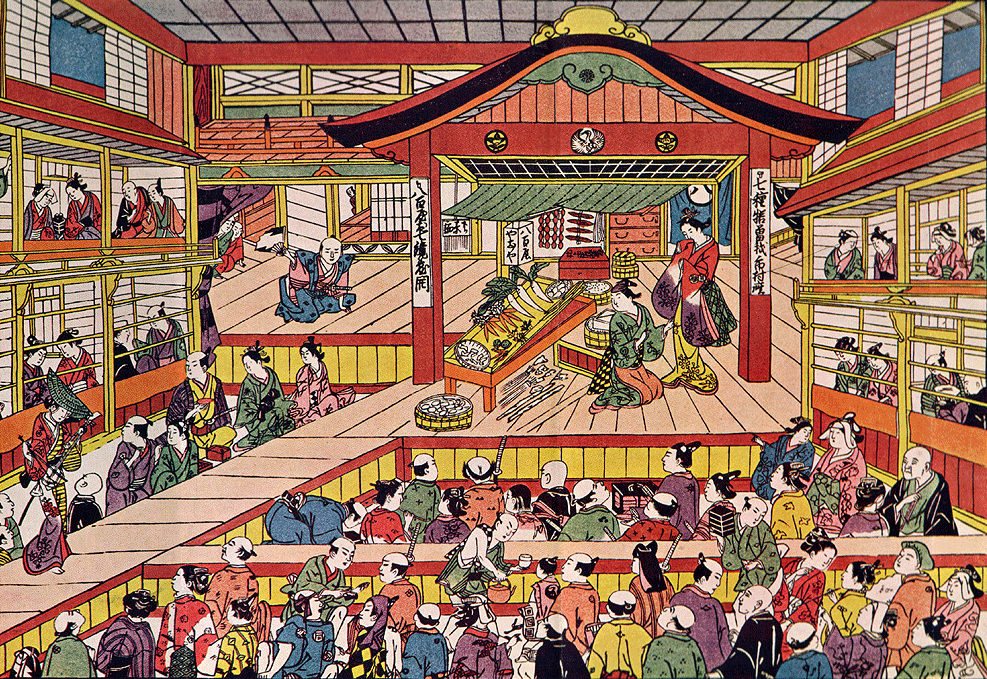
Shibai Ukie ("A Scene from a Play") by Masanobu Okumura (1686–1764), depicting Edo Ichimura-za theater in the early 1740s

The Japanese kabuki stage features a projection called a hanamichi (花道; literally, flower path), a walkway which extends into the audience and via which dramatic entrances and exits are made. Okuni also performed on a hanamichi stage with her entourage. The stage is used not only as a walkway or path to get to and from the main stage, but important scenes are also played on the stage. Kabuki stages and theaters have steadily become more technologically sophisticated, and innovations including revolving stages and trap doors were introduced during the 18th century. A driving force has been the desire to manifest one frequent theme of kabuki theater, that of the sudden, dramatic revelation or transformation. A number of stage tricks, including actors' rapid appearance and disappearance, employ these innovations. The term keren (外連), often translated playing to the gallery, is sometimes used as a catch-all for these tricks. Hanamichi and several innovations including revolving stage, seri and chunori have all contributed to kabuki play. Hanamichi creates depth and both seri and chunori provide a vertical dimension.

=== Koothambalam ===
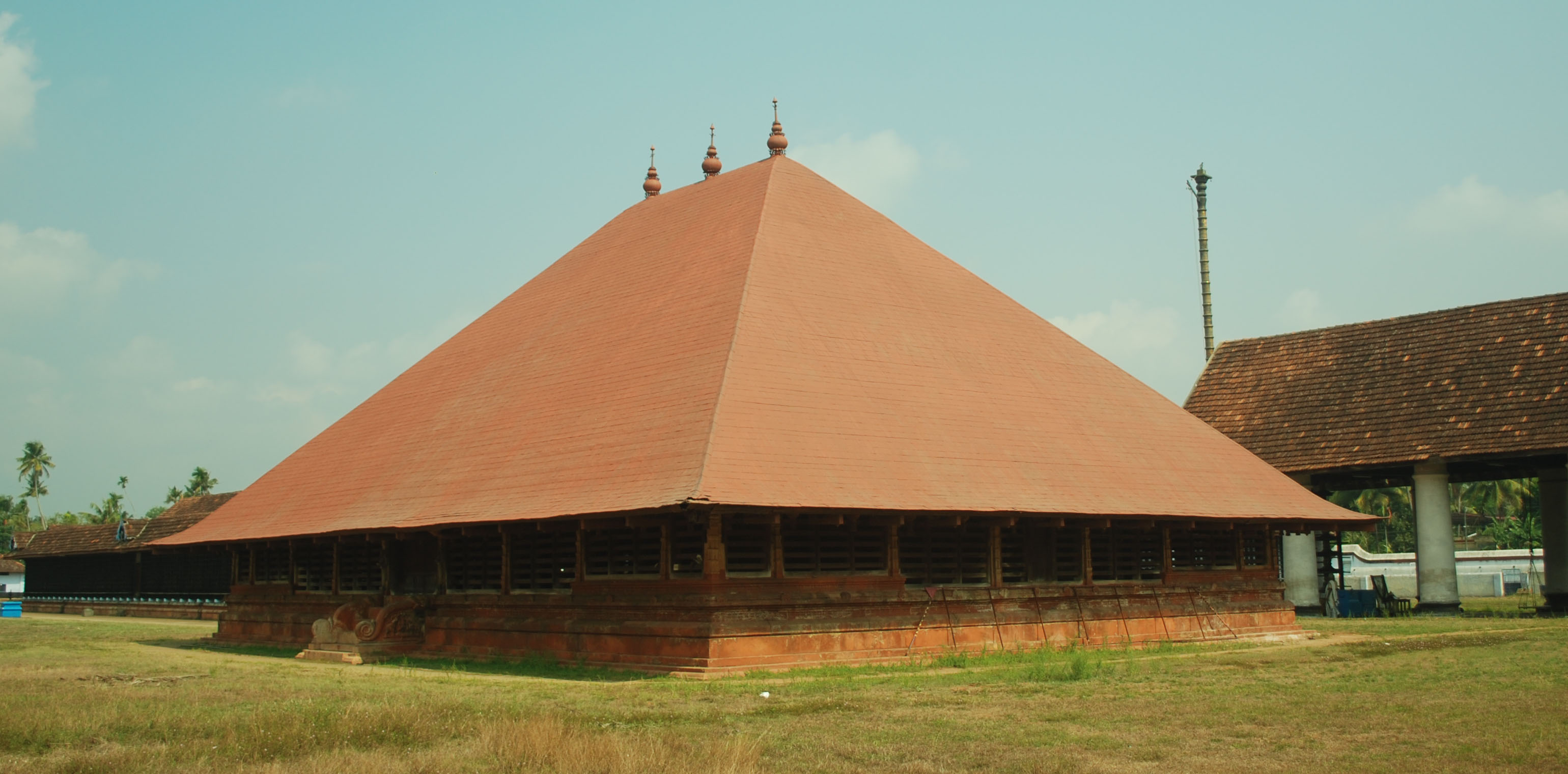
Koothambalam Theatre Exterior

The Indian Koothambalam temple is a space used to perform Sanskrit drama. Called the koothambalam or kuttampalam, it is a large high-caste rectangular, temple in Kerala which represented a "visual sacrifice" to any deities or gods of the temple. They were built for kutiyattam or "combined acting" performances, which only two dramas are performed today.

The temple has a pyramidal roof, with high walls, and a high-ceilinged interior. Within the large temple has a stage inside which is a large platform with its own pyramid roof. The stage area is separate from the audience area with the musician (a drummer on a high seat) behind the stage, and dressing rooms also at the rear with exit doors behind. The audience would be seated on a smooth, polished floor. Several Koothambalams exist within several Indian temples, and follow the same rectangular plan and structure.

== See also ==
- Auditorium
- Entertainment
- Learning space
- List of national theaters
- The Theatre of Small Convenience, the smallest theater in the world
