= Natasha Wilson =

New Zealand opera singer

Natasha Te Rupe Wilson
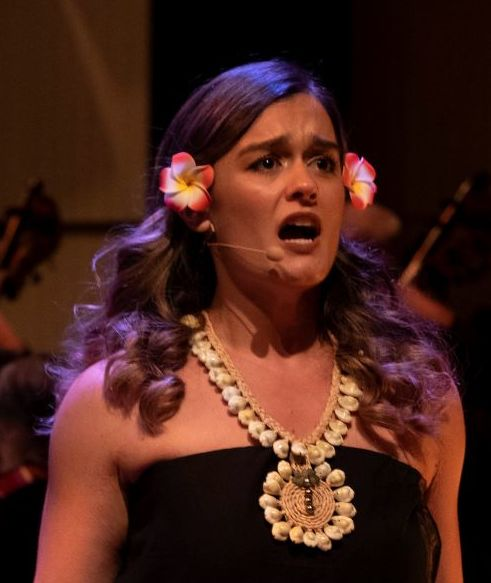
- As Purea in 2021 New Zealand Opera premiere of Ihitai 'Avei'a – Star Navigator
- Born: 1994 (age 31–32); Auckland
- Education: University of Auckland, San Francisco Conservatory of Music
- Occupation: Soprano opera singer

Natasha Te Rupe Wilson (born 1994) is a New Zealand soprano opera singer of Māori and Pākehā heritage.

== Life ==
Wilson was born and brought up in Auckland, New Zealand. Her father was Māori and her mother of European heritage. She affiliates to the iwi Te Arawa and Ngāpuhi.

Wilson's father Brian, who died in 2017, was a tenor vocalist and bass guitarist in the heavy-metal band Naked Blade, which toured New Zealand in the 1980s and 1990s. Brian Wilson instilled a love of singing in her and her three siblings, singing show tunes and soundtracks with them in the car and teaching them to harmonise from an early age; he encouraged his daughter to pursue classical music as a career. Natasha Wilson's first exposure to classical singing was from a DVD of The Phantom of the Opera her father brought home when she was 12, especially the aria "Think of Me".

Wilson attended Westlake Girls High School, and was taught music by Morag Atchison, a lecturer in voice at the University of Auckland. Aitchison, a vocal tutor for the New Zealand Youth Choir in which Wilson participated, took her as a student and continued as her vocal coach outside of school.

Wilson graduated in 2016 from the University of Auckland with a Bachelor of Music (Honours first class), majoring in classical vocal performance.

== Career ==
From 2016 Wilson was supported and mentored by the Kiri Te Kanawa Foundation.

In 2017 Wilson won the Dame Malvina Major Foundation Dunedin Aria contest. She was asked to be a soprano soloist for a Spanish Baroque concert series with the Australian Brandenburg Orchestra in Sydney, in a performance that incorporated contemporary circus performers. She returned to sing in the orchestra's Bittersweet Obsessions concert. The same year she received a scholarship to attend Patricia Hurley’s Italian for NZ Opera Singers Masterclasses and Concerts in Italy as part of the Dame Malvina Major Foundation Opera Studies Programme.

In 2018 Wilson was a semi-finalist in the Lexus Song Quest and became a Dame Malvina Major Foundation Emerging Artist with New Zealand Opera. Her opera debut was a small role in The Mikado with New Zealand Opera. She performed in two other New Zealand Opera productions that year, as Paquette in Candide at the Auckland Arts Festival that March, and as Gianetta in The Elixir of Love, having spent part of the year touring a short "Opera in Schools" adaptation of the production in which she sang Adina. That August she appeared with Samson Setu and Manase Latu in a production of Gilbert and Sullivan's Trial by Jury, staged in Christchurch's old High Court building. In September she was soprano soloist in a Dunedin Symphony Orchestra performance of Carmina Burana, her last New Zealand role before she left to study overseas.

In September 2018 Wilson undertook a year-long postgraduate diploma in voice at the San Francisco Conservatory of Music under César Ulloa. As well as training her voice she studied acting, stage combat, and Alexander Technique.

In July 2019 she sang Zerlina with the Auckland Philharmonia Orchestra in a concert production of Don Giovanni. She then returned to the USA to spend 2019 and 2020 as a resident artist with the Pittsburgh Opera. She sang Rosalba in the company's 2019 production of Catán’s Florencia en el Amazonas, and Morgana in 2020 production of Handel's Alcina. Her performance in Alcina was described as "an absolute delight", and her " charismatic whimsy and light, supple voice" praised.

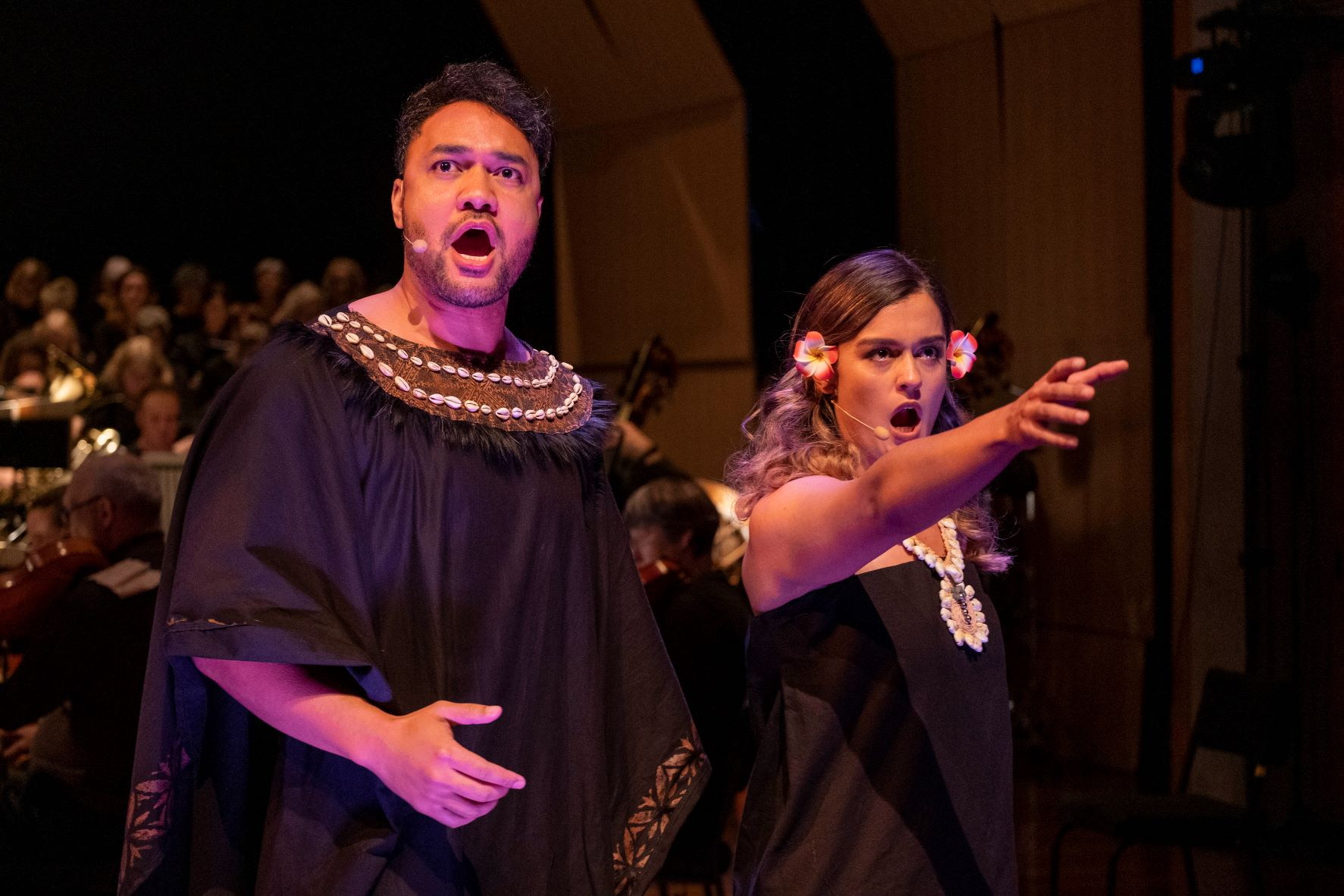
With Amitai Pati in 2021 New Zealand Opera production of Ihitai 'Avei'a – Star Navigator

She took up a position with Pittsburgh Opera with a two-year contract, which was cut short by the COVID-19 pandemic, forcing her to return to New Zealand. On her return she sang Lisa in Bellini's La sonnambula, to an audience of 200 in an outdoor performance in Days Bay near Wellington staged by Rhona Fraser.

After working for some years on the part with composer and musician Tim Finn, she played the role Purea in the 2021 New Zealand Opera premiere of Ihitai 'Avei'a – Star Navigator. All three performances sold out, and she was praised as "one of Aotearoa’s most glorious sopranos." In 2021 she performed a "vivacious" Zelina in Wellington Opera Company's production of Don Giovanni, and Marzelline in an Auckland Philharmonia Orchestra’s concert performance of Fidelio.

In November 2021 she was awarded the $50,000 Dame Malvina Major Award recognising her “track record, talent, determination and potential”. The award, funded by Joan Egan through the Dame Malvina Major Foundation, supports the career development of talented young opera singers handpicked by the Foundation.

Wilson says her favourite roles are Adina in The Elixir of Love, which she understudied for in the New Zealand Opera production, and Susanna in Mozart's The Marriage of Figaro, which she performed in San Francisco (especially the final aria "Deh vieni, non tardar"). She is a light lyric coloratura soprano, with a voice suited to the Italianate operas of Donizetti and Mozart.
