= New Zealand Opera =

Opera company in New Zealand (2000–)

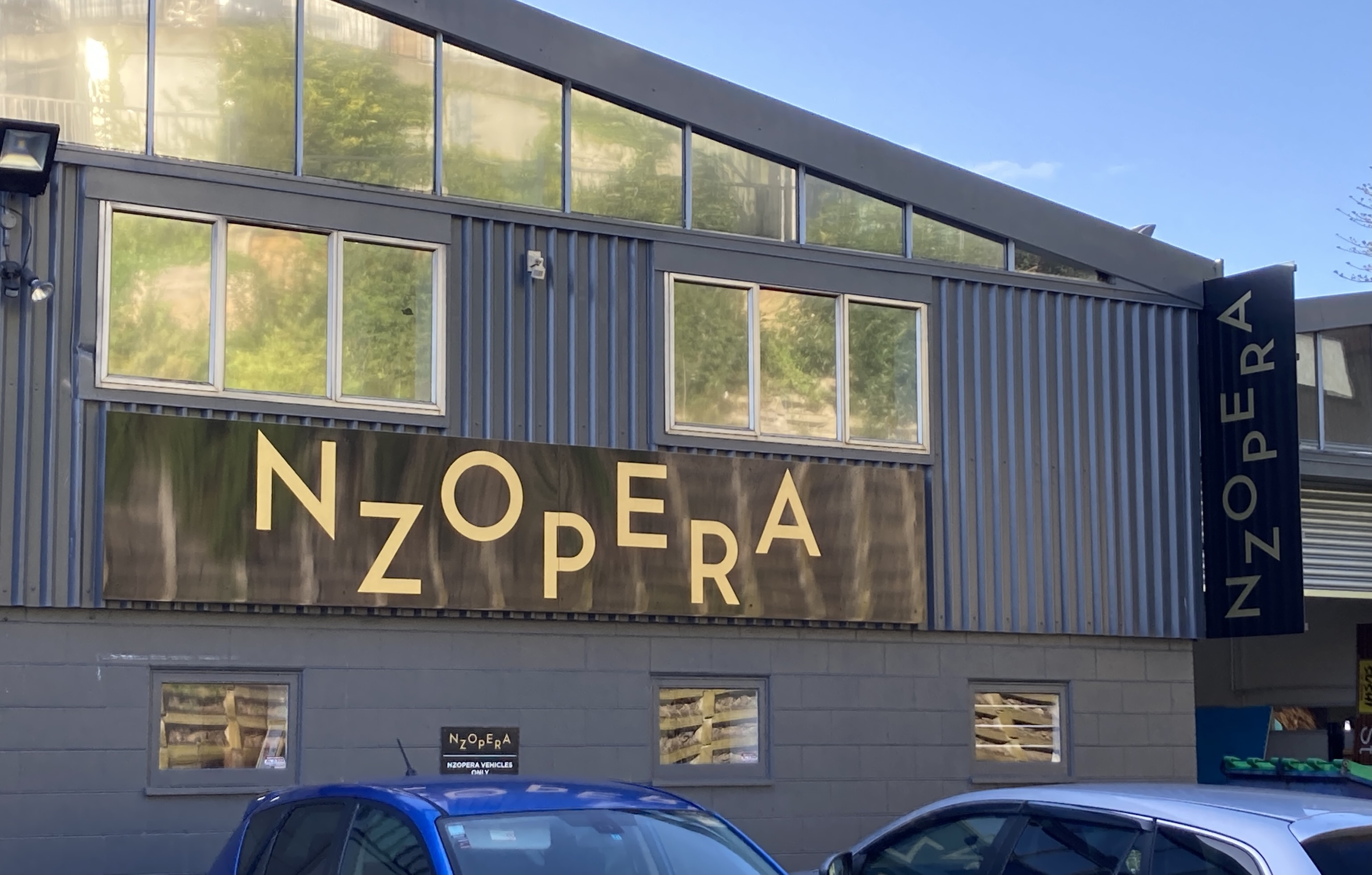
- Headquarters in Parnell, Auckland
- Formation: 2000
- Merger of: Auckland Opera; Wellington City Opera; Southern Opera
- Type: Opera company
- Location: Auckland, New Zealand
- General Director: Brad Cohen
- Website: nzopera.com
- Formerly called: The NBR New Zealand Opera

New Zealand Opera is New Zealand's only full-time professional opera company, formed in 2000 from the merger of companies in Auckland and Wellington (and later Christchurch). New Zealand Opera is headquartered in Parnell, Auckland, stages several productions a year, runs educational programmes, and supports early-career opera singers with the Dame Malvina Major Foundation.

== History ==
The company was formed in 2000 when Opera New Zealand (the name adopted by Auckland Opera in 1995) and The National Opera of Wellington (formerly Wellington City Opera) decided to merge into one organisation for financial reasons. It launched on 15 October 1999 as The National Business Review New Zealand Opera (the National Business Review had paid $1,000,000 for naming rights for the next three years); the NBR sponsorship ceased in 2014 and its name became NZ Opera.

A further merger with Southern Opera in Christchurch in 2012 allowed the company to maintain a nation-wide presence and stage work in all three cities. The company maintains a head office in Parnell, Auckland, and has a second office in Wellington. The Technical Centre in Auckland housed costumes, set-building, and a rehearsal space, and later combined with the NZ Opera offices to form The Opera Centre.

NZ Opera coordinates and administers the Dame Malvina Major Foundation's Artist Development Programme, a training programme for emerging opera singers. Notable alumni include Phillip Rhodes, Anna Leese, Manase Latu, Samson Setu and Thomas Atkins.

== Leadership ==
In the late 1990s Jonathan Alver became General Director of Opera New Zealand, and oversaw the merger with The National Opera of Wellington to create the present company. In 2002 he was succeeded by Alex Reedijk, who left in 2005 to run Scottish Opera. Reedijk was followed by Aidan Lang, and in turn was followed as general director in 2014 by Stuart Maunder. Maunder took a position as Artistic Director with State Opera South Australia in 2018 and was replaced by Thomas de Mallet Burgess. In October 2022 Burgess was selected as the new Artistic Director of Finnish National Opera, starting in August 2023. Brad Cohen, an opera conductor and administrator and former artistic director of West Australian Opera became the General Director in late 2023.

== Funding ==
When the Wellington and Auckland companies merged, NBR's million dollar sponsorship was possibly the largest in the history of the NZ performing arts. The company was also supported by the law firm Chapman Tripp, who gave their name to the Chapman Tripp Opera Chorus, the company's resident chorus. By 2011, NZ Opera's Creative New Zealand funding had increased to $2.2 million a year, double the amount of a few years previously. In 2019 Creative New Zealand gave $2.7 million to NZ Opera, with an additional $1.2 million coming from Auckland ($1.1m), Wellington, ($67,744) and Christchurch ($70,000) city councils.

== Productions ==
The first production of the newly-merged NZ Opera in 2000 was a sold-out season of Verdi's Aida. Since then the company has put on two or more productions a year, performed in Auckland, Wellington, and Christchurch. It also runs educational programmes for young people and touring productions to other venues.

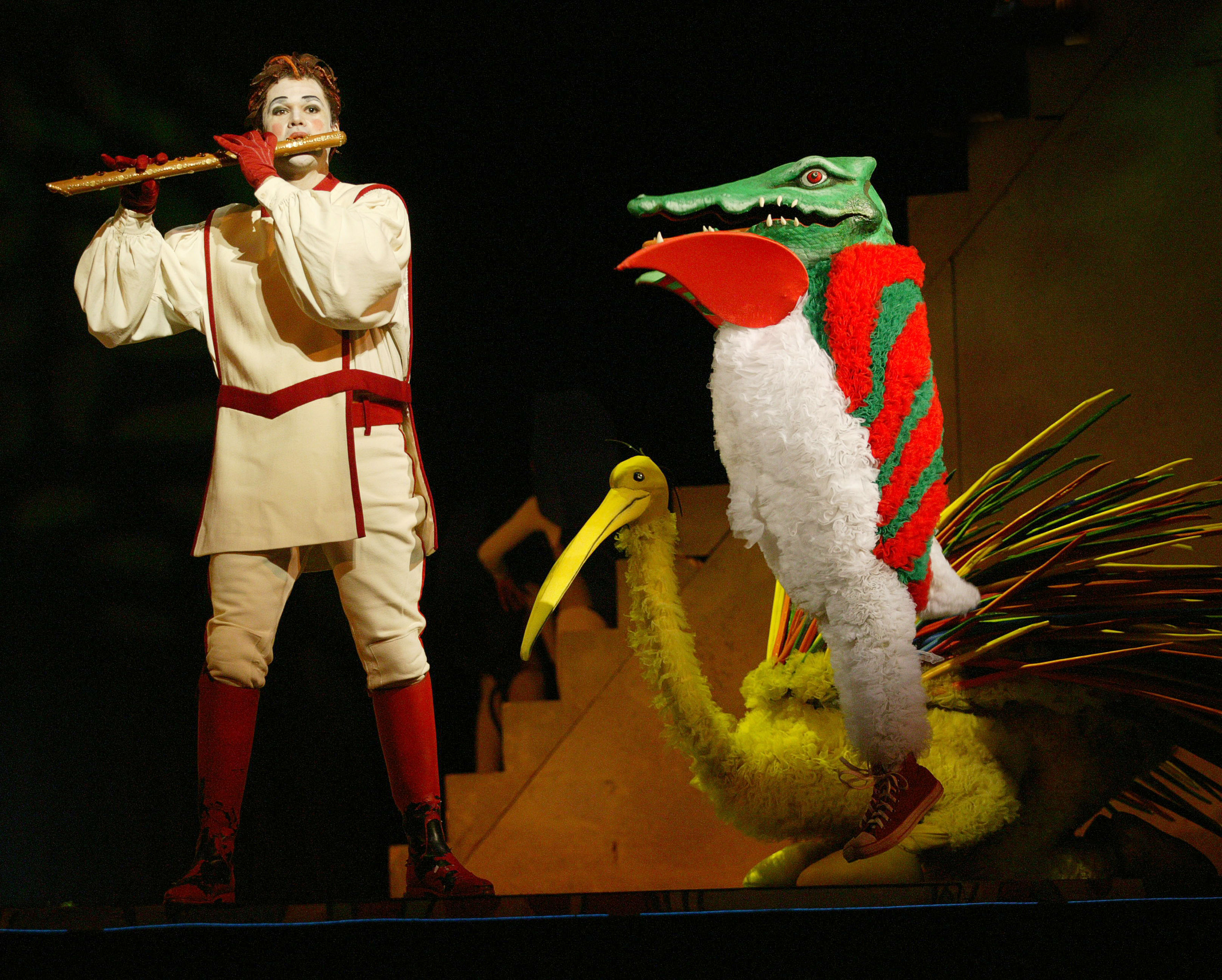
Tamino (Adrian Strooper) plays his magic flute to charm the animals in the 2006 production of Mozart's The Magic Flute

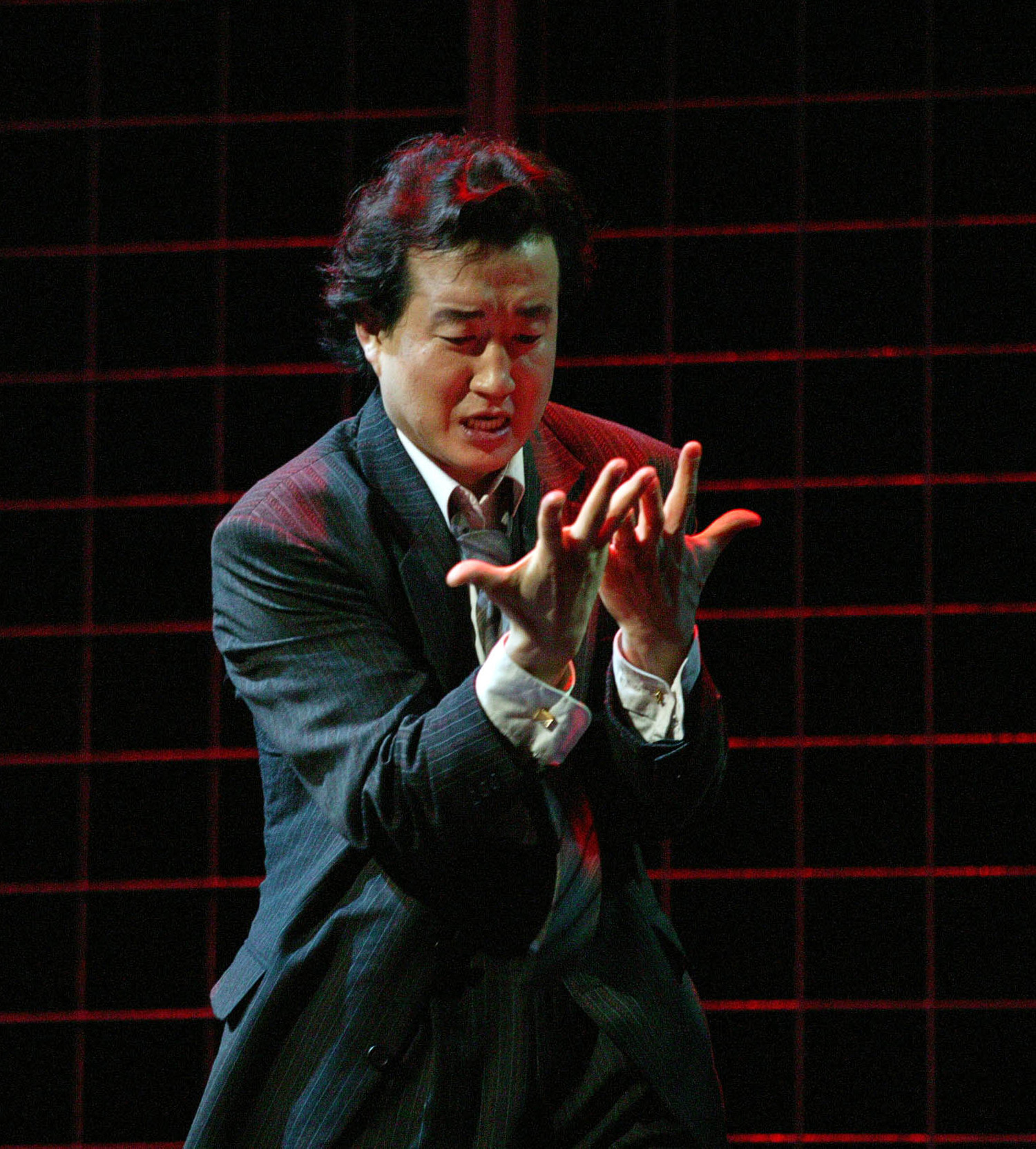
Faust (Jaewoo Kim) realises the consequences of his actions in the 2006 production of Gounod's opera.

The Marriage of Figaro was staged in 2002. Italian soprano Nuccia Focile played the Countess and Wendy Dawn Thompson was Cherubino, with Aidan Lang directing his first production for the company. New Zealand bass Wade Kernot and Australian soprano Emma Pearson (married in real life) sang the lead roles of Figaro and Susanna. NZ Opera staged Figaro again in 2010, and once more in 2021 with Emma Pearson returning in the role of the Countess.

The company's 2006 production of Mozart's The Magic Flute was directed by Stanley M. Garner based on a production by Sir Peter Hall. Australian tenor Adrian Strooper sang Tamino, Richard Burkhard was Papageno, and Tiffany Speight sang Pamina. Phillip Rhodes sang Monostatos. The production design by cartoonist Gerald Scarfe included fantastical animals such as a hybrid crocodile-penguin. Also that year was a production of Gounod's Faust, directed by Mike Ashman. The principals were Mikhail Svetlov (Méphistophélès), Anne Sophie Dupreis (Marguerite) and Jaewoo Kim (Faust).

In 2008 the company took a touring production of Humperdinck's Hansel and Gretel to 15 venues the entire length of New Zealand, from Kerikeri in the north to Invercargill in the south. It was director Michael Hurst's first foray into opera. Later that year, the company's production of Janáček's Jenůfa was the first staged in New Zealand (an Australian company had toured the opera in the 1970s), with a notable performance of the Grandmother Kostelnicka by New Zealand soprano Margaret Medlyn.

Australian director Patrick Nolan staged Tchaikovsky's Eugene Onegin in 2009, with Anna Leese as Tatyana and Russian tenor Roman Shulackoff as Lensky. It was production designer Genevieve Blanchett's first opera set. Eugene Onegin was described as the "most polished, most evenly cast production" yet from NZ Opera, and Anna Leese was called "one of the great female voices to emerge from New Zealand".

In 2011 the company staged Handel's Xerxes, with costumes by Trelise Cooper, and a double bill of the one-act operas Cavalleria Rusticana and Pagliacci. These used a play-within-a-play convention, with the opening scene of Pagliacci being the closing scene of Cavalleria, linked by the prologue of Tonio. Cavalleria Rusticana featured English tenor Peter Auty as Turidda and Ukrainian soprano Anna Shafajinskaia as Santuzza. Mexican tenor Rafael Rojas sang Canio in Pagliacci, and Anna Leese sang Nedda.

The 2012 production of Rigoletto again starred Rafael Rojas, as the Duke, and critic Lindis Taylor noted the company's "continuing practice of using too many singers from overseas, when New Zealand boasts of producing so many who are gifted". Lindy Hume's production had a modern setting, referencing the scandals of Berlusconi's Italy.

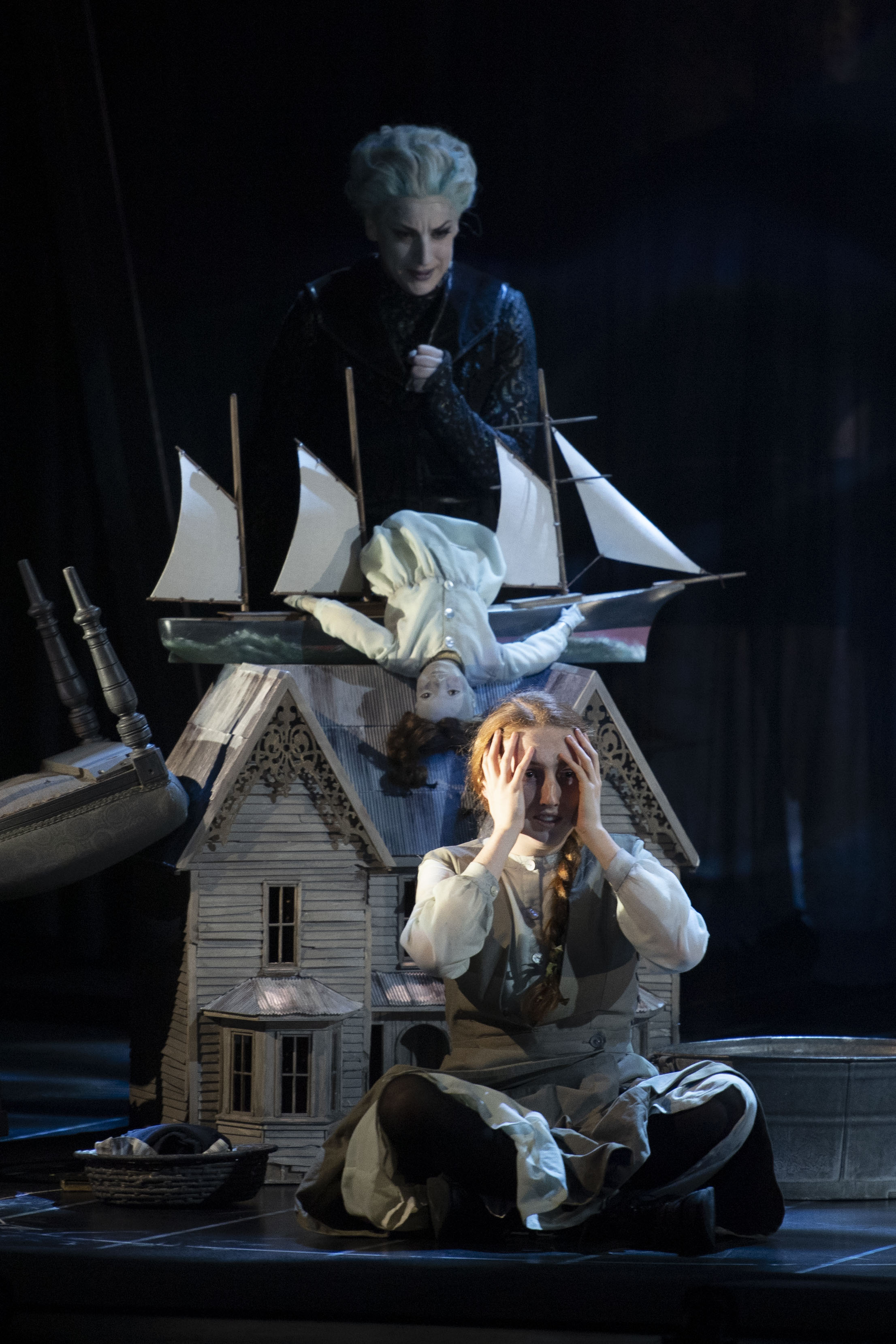
Flora (Alexa Harwood) haunted by the ghost of Miss Jessel (Madeleine Pierard) in 2019's The Turn of the Screw.

Wyn Davies conducted Don Giovanni in 2013, with Mark Stone and Jonathan Lemalu as the leads. In an update critic Ian Dando described as "ill-advised", the Don is dispatched to Hell at the climax not by the animated statue Il Commendatore, but by a man in a blue suit. The production was featured in the Christchurch Arts Festival, making it the first fully-staged opera in Christchurch since the merger with Southern Opera in 2009.

The company's 2015 Tosca, with Orla Boylan (Tosca) and Phillip Rhodes (Scarpia) had Simon O'Neill singing Cavaradossi. O'Neill, a tenor who usually performs German repertoire, gave what critic Peter Mechan described as "a performance that I think will be talked about here for years to come." For the 2019 Auckland Arts Festival the company staged The Barber of Seville, and put on productions of Don Giovanni and Benjamin Britten's The Turn of the Screw, directed by newly-arrived Thomas de Mallet Burgess. In the latter Anna Leese gave a critically-noted performance as the Governess and Jared Holt was a "terrifying and seductive" Peter Quint. The production (sung in English) unusually did not use surtitles, and reviewers disagreed on how intelligible the sung dialogue was. A departure from the canonical opera repertoire the company usually performed, it had full houses in both Auckland and Wellington.

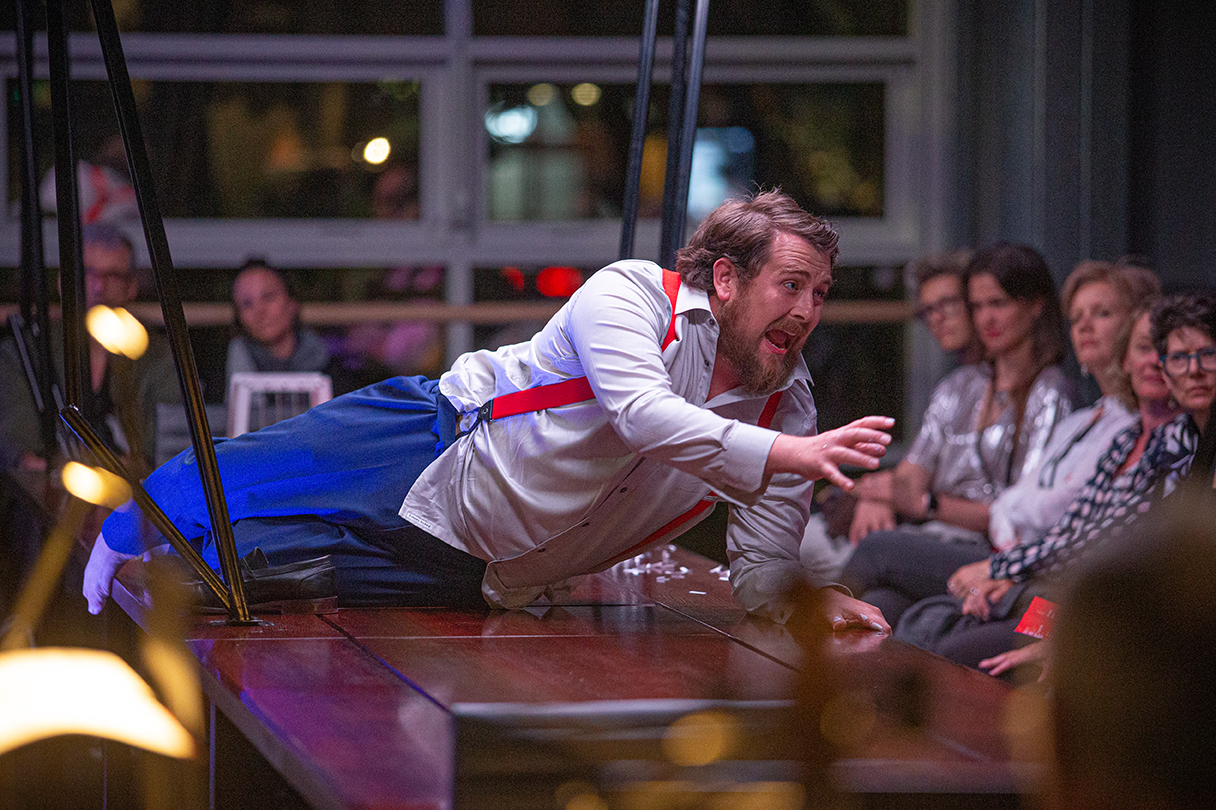
Robert Tucker in the 2020 production of Eight Songs for a Mad King

In 2020, NZ Opera embarked on what it called a strategy of 'revisioning opera' in New Zealand. It began by staging Francis Poulenc's 1958 one-woman opera The Human Voice in six different hotel rooms around New Zealand to an audience of around 20 each time. Fiona McAndrew alternated the roles with Amanda Atlas. A second solo production was Peter Maxwell Davies' Eight Songs for a Mad King, in the Ellen Melville Centre in Auckland, Wellington's RNZB Dance Centre, and Christchurch's Tūranga central library, starring baritone Robert Tucker as a modern CEO instead of George III. Half the audience was seated in the boardroom with Tucker, the other half observed from outside with headphones; audiences then changed places. Handel's Semele was staged in Auckland's Holy Trinity Cathedral, with soprano Emma Pearson as Semele and Amitai Pati, in his NZ Opera debut, as Jove. Sarah Castle and Paul Whelan, New Zealand singers normally based overseas who had returned home in response to the COVID-19 pandemic, sang Juno and Cadmus respectively.

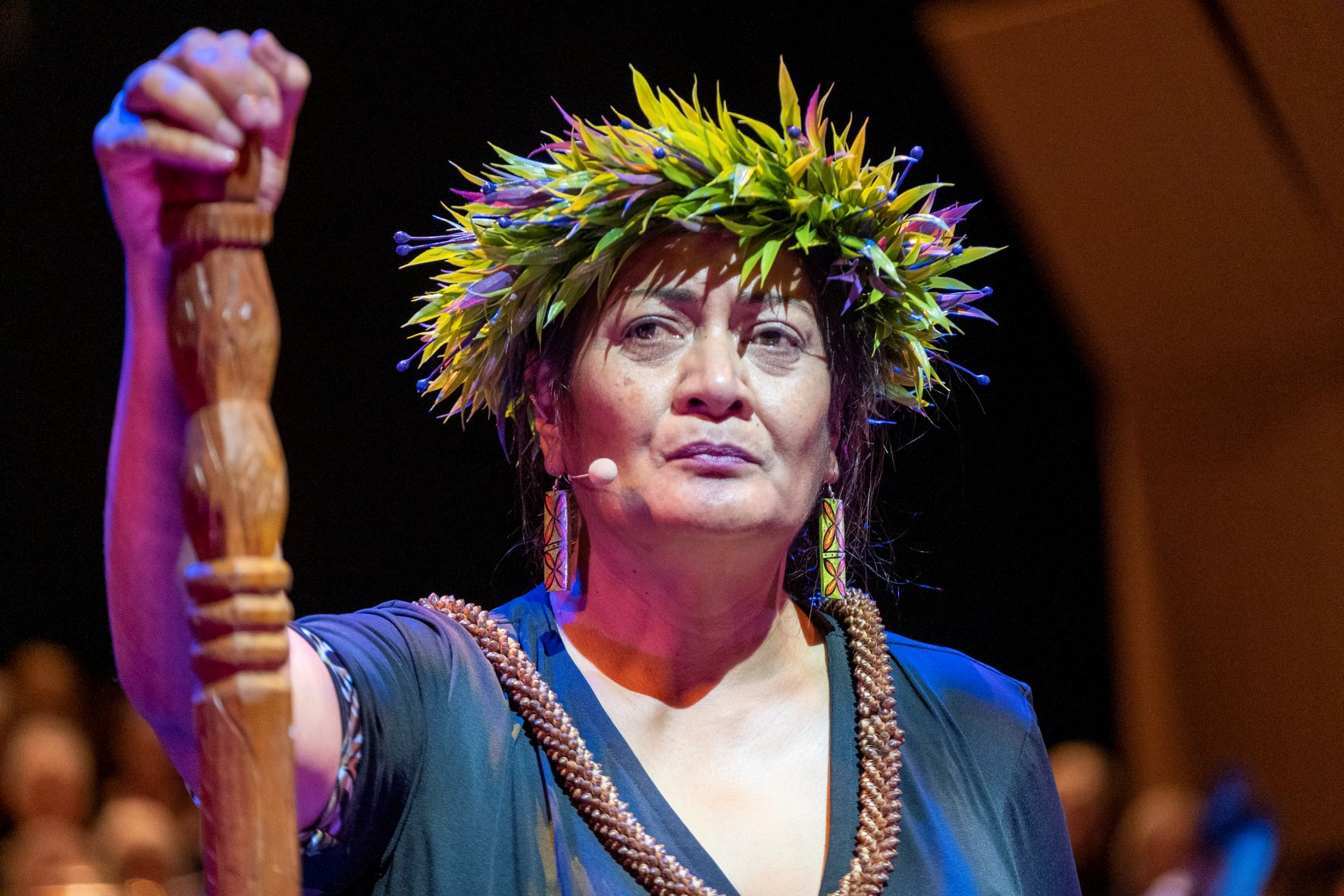
Norah Stevenson-Tuuga as The Orator in the 2021 premiere of Ihitai 'Avei'a – Star Navigator

The company's 2021 season opened with Ihitai 'Avei'a - Star Navigator, a new work by Tim Finn with monologues from Tahitian novelist Célestine Hitiura Vaite. The first opera to be performed in Tahitian, Māori, and English, it tells the story of Tupaia (sung by Amitai Pati) and James Cook (sung by Paul Whelan) on the Endeavour's 1769 voyage. All three performances sold out, and Natasha Wilson as Purea was praised as "one of Aotearoa’s most glorious sopranos."

In May 2021 de Mallet Burgess announced that NZ Opera would be commissioning a comic opera based on the saga of the "unruly tourists" who visited New Zealand in January 2019. Luke Di Somma was to compose the work to a libretto by comedians Livi Reihana and Amanda Kennedy of the Fan Brigade. One of the characters would be a journalist covering the events. The opera, which would combine opera and musical theatre singers, was to be staged in 2022. Less than two weeks later three of NZ Opera's board members – Murray Shaw, Witi Ihimaera, and Rachel Walkinton – resigned in protest at the artistic direction of the company. They were replaced by Carol Hirschfeld, Joanna Heslop, and Te Oti Rakena. The Unruly Tourists was in the end postponed when the Omicron wave of the COVID-19 pandemic arrived in New Zealand.

In May 2022 The Strangest of Angels premiered in Christchurch: a chamber opera based on Janet Frame's time in Seacliff Mental Hospital. Frame was sung by Jayne Tankersley, and Anna Leese played her nurse; the opera was a collaboration between Leese, composer Kenneth Young and librettist Georgia Jamieson Emms.
