= Ihitai 'Avei'a - Star Navigator =

New Zealand opera composed by Tim Finn

Ihitai 'Avei'a – Star Navigator
- by Tim Finn, Tom McLeod
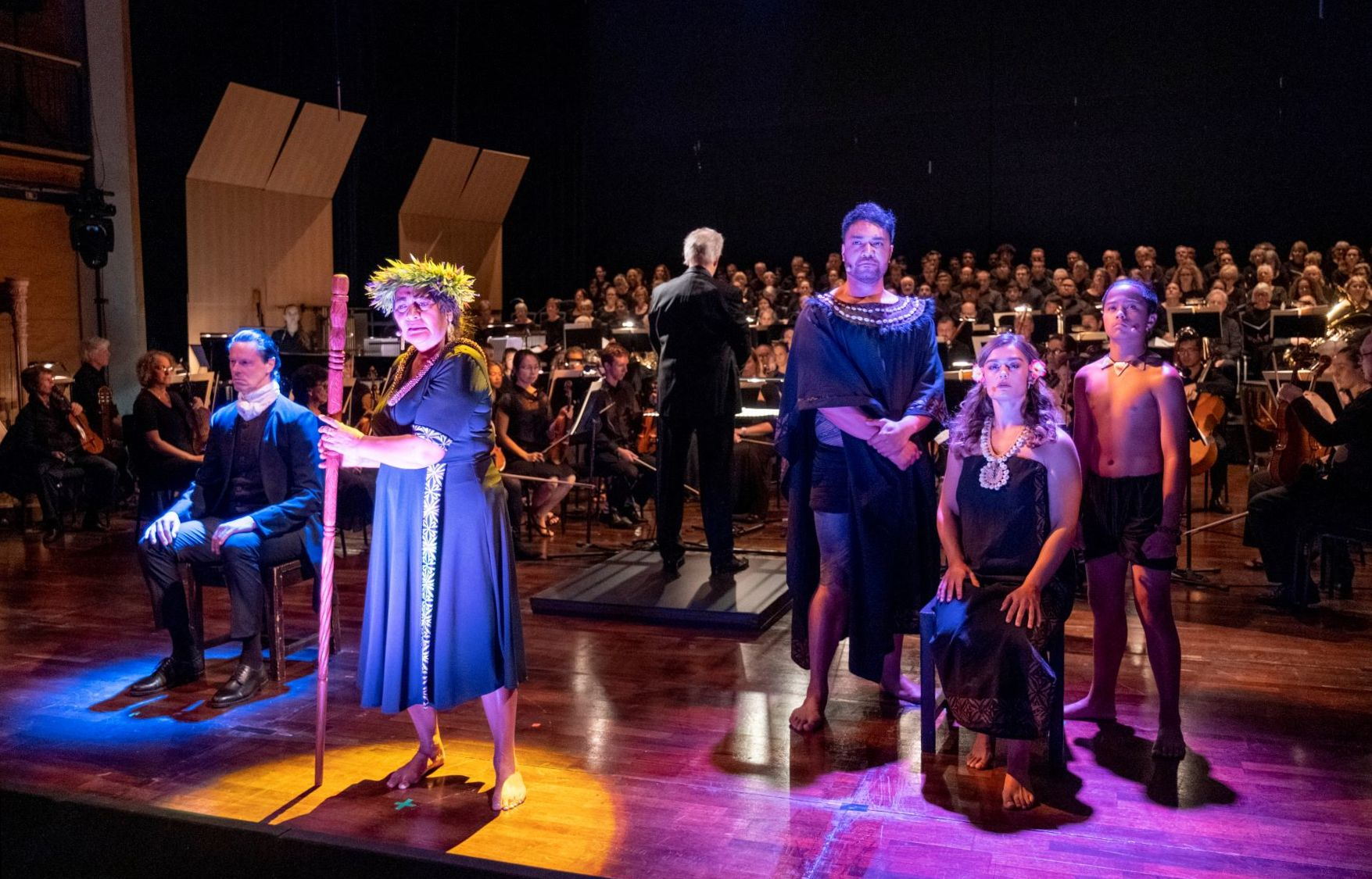
- Librettist: Célestine Hitiura Vaite
- Language: English, Tahitian
- Premiere: 19 March 2021; Vodafone Events Centre, Manukau

Ihitai 'Avei'a – Star Navigator is an opera composed by Tim Finn and co-composed by Tom McLeod, with monologues from Tahitian novelist Célestine Hitiura Vaite, and is the first opera to be performed in Tahitian and English. It premiered to full houses in March 2021 in a production by New Zealand Opera, with Paul Whelan as Captain James Cook and Amitai Pati as Tahitian priest Tupaia.

== Origin ==
The opera was composed by ex-Split Enz and Crowded House musician Tim Finn, who had had a fascination with the sea and astronomy since childhood. Working with composer and orchestrator Tom McLeod, Finn approached Tahitian writer Célestine Hitiura Vaite to collaborate in 2018 after reading her novel Breadfruit; Vaite wrote monologues in Tahitian to accompany Finn's songs. Additional lyrics were written by Gary Henderson. Finn twice visited Raiatea and the sacred marae of Taputapuatea as part of the composition process. The opera is the first to be performed in both English and Tahitian. It was co-commissioned by New Zealand Opera and West Australian Opera.

== Plot ==
The opera tells the story of Tahitian high priest and navigator Tupaia (sung by Amitai Pati) and British naval captain James Cook (sung by Paul Whelan) on the maiden voyage of the Endeavour in 1769. A central theme is the cultural clash between the traditional Polynesian navigation lore of Tupaia and the Western scientific knowledge of Cook. The plot encompasses the meeting of Cook and the Tahitians, and the Endeavour's voyage to Batavia, but does not include first contact between Tupaia and the people of Aotearoa.

== Performance ==
New Zealand Opera opened its 2021 season with the premiere of Ihitai 'Avei'a at the Vodafone Events Centre in Manukau, Auckland, directed by John G. Davies. All three performances over 19 and 20 March sold out. The opera was staged as a concert performance with the Manukau Symphony Orchestra, Auckland Choral Society, and the Graduate Choir New Zealand conducted by Uwe Grodd. Finn accompanied on piano and acoustic guitar.

Amitai Pati sang the role of Tupaia and Paul Whelan sang James Cook. Natasha Wilson as Purea, the apparition of Tupaia's former love, was praised as "one of Aotearoa’s most glorious sopranos." The Tahitian monologues were performed by Aiolupotea Norah Stevenson-Tuuga, and the child acolyte Teata was played by H'zel Hetaraka.

A second production was scheduled for 28 March 2021 by West Australian Opera at the Perth Concert Hall, with James Clayton singing the role of Cook and Ta'u Pupu'a as Tupaia. The COVID-19 pandemic and the closing of the travel bubble between New Zealand and Australia led to the production being postponed until 13 August, and then cancelled.

== Performers ==
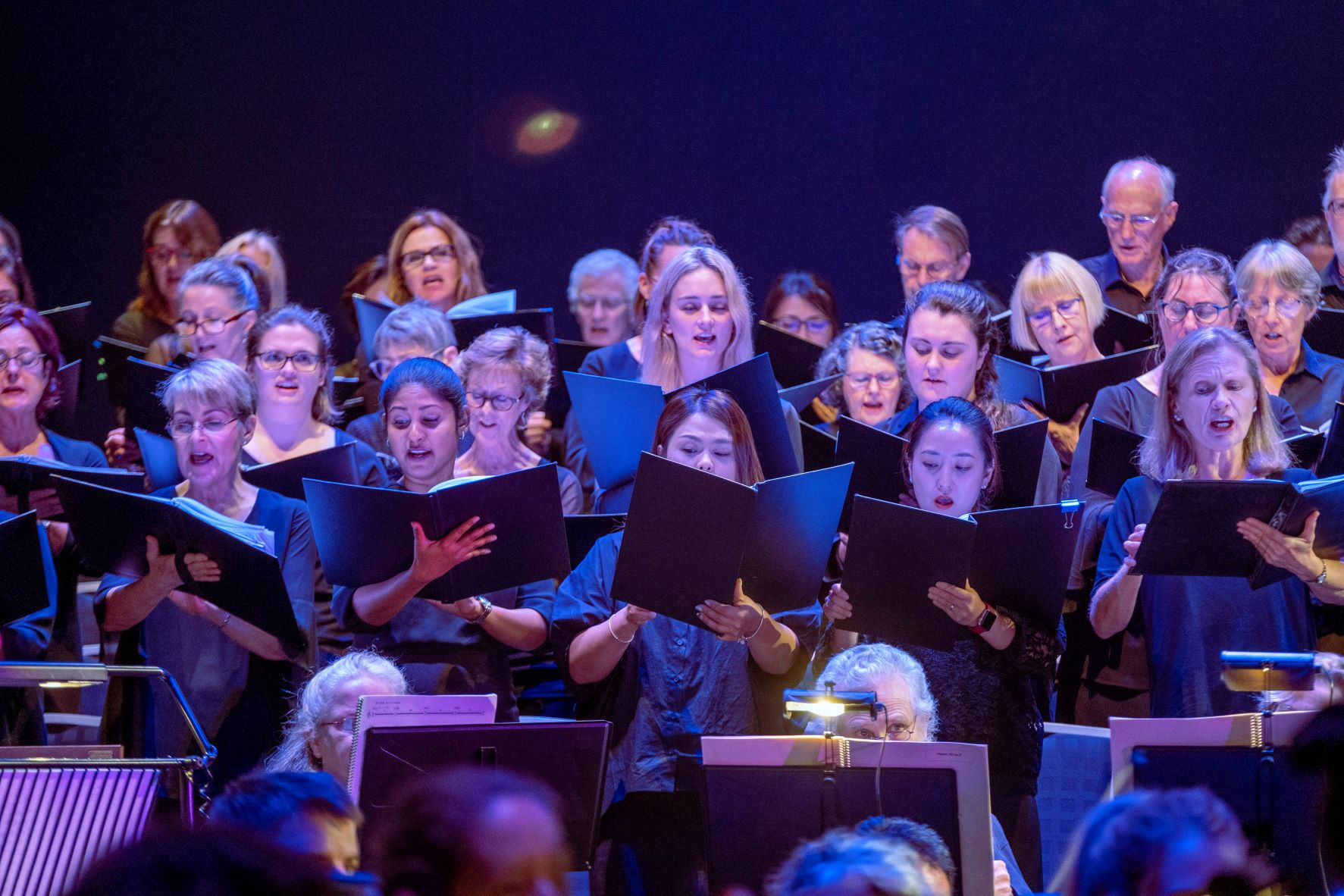
Choir

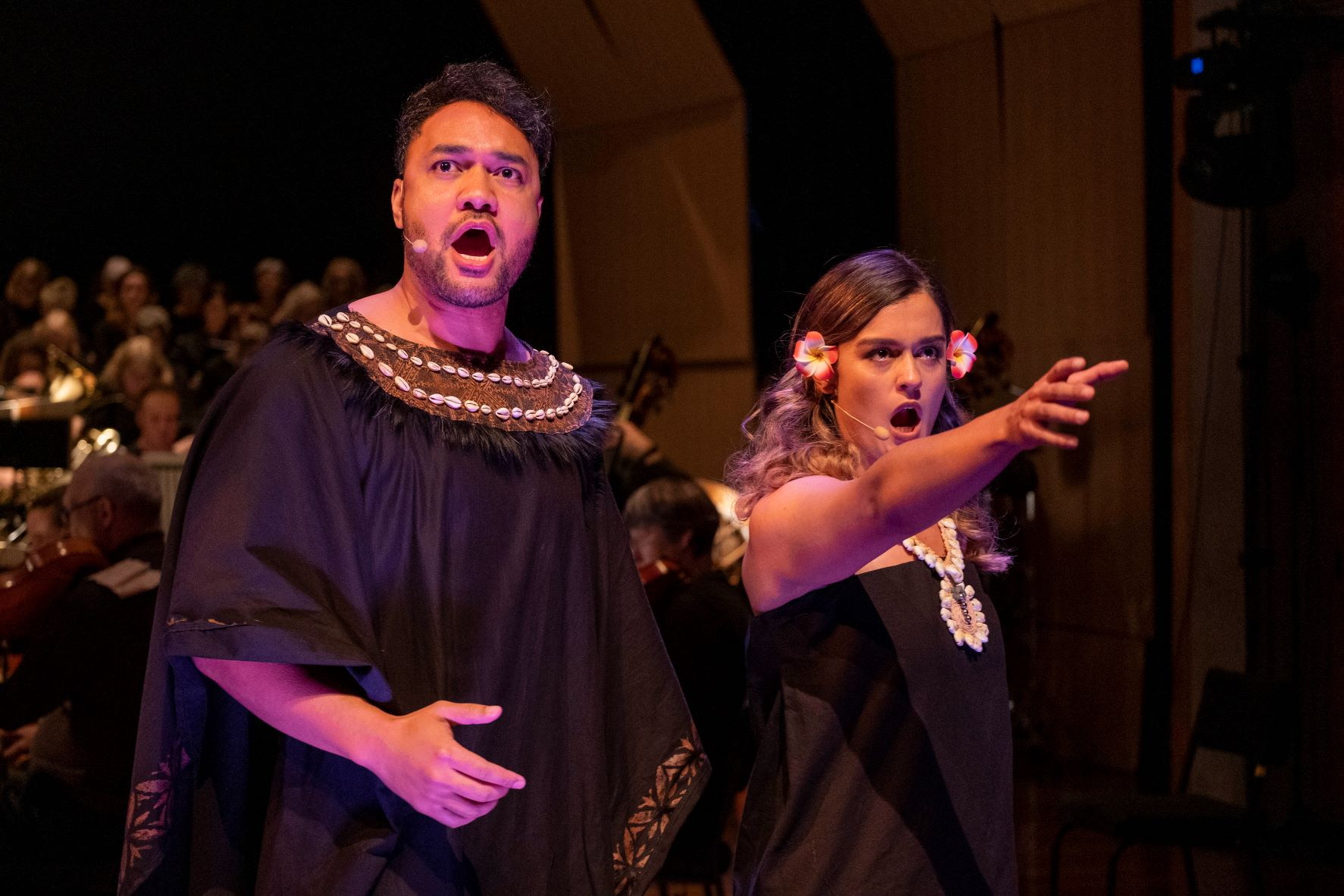
Tupaia and Purea

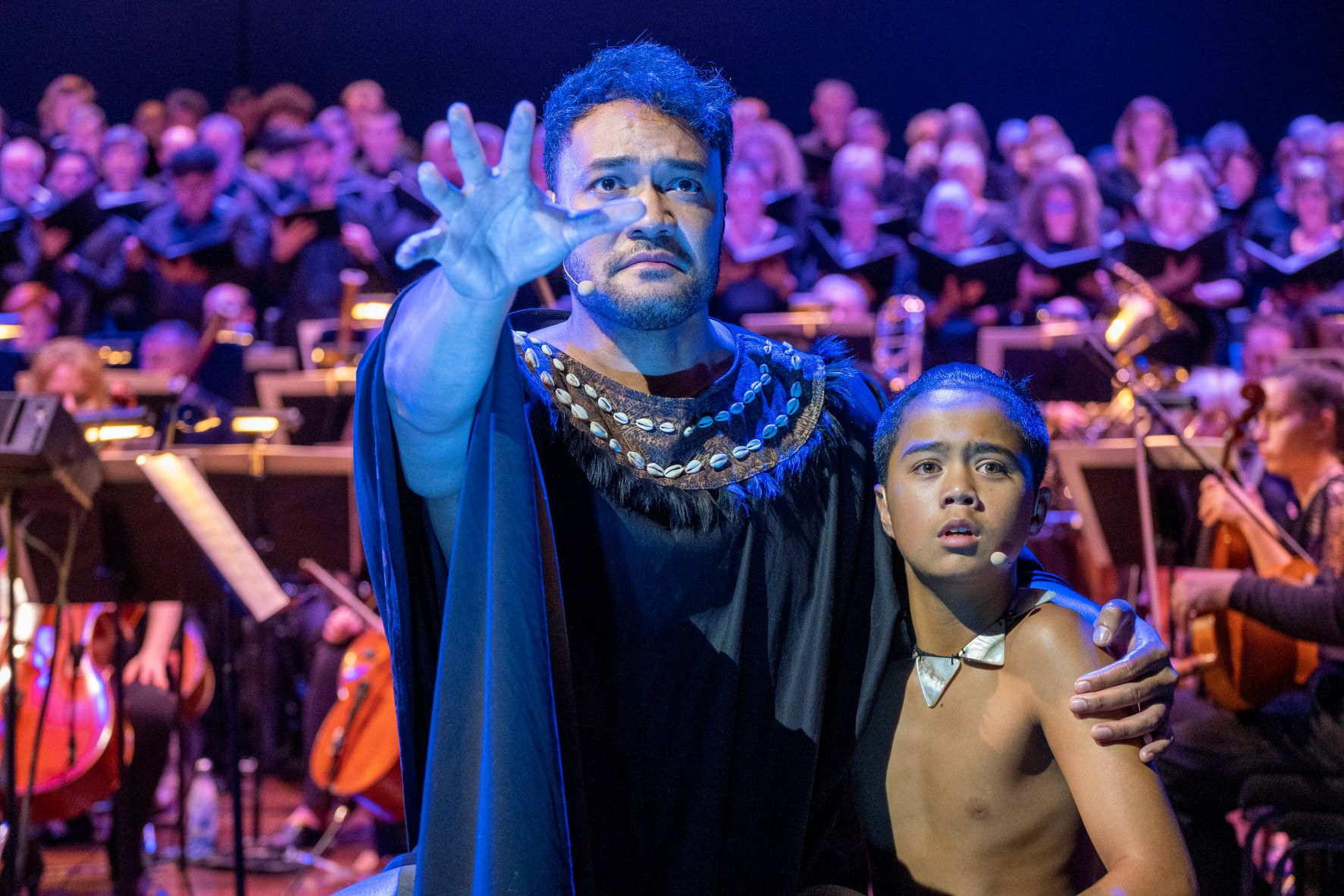
Tupaia and Teata

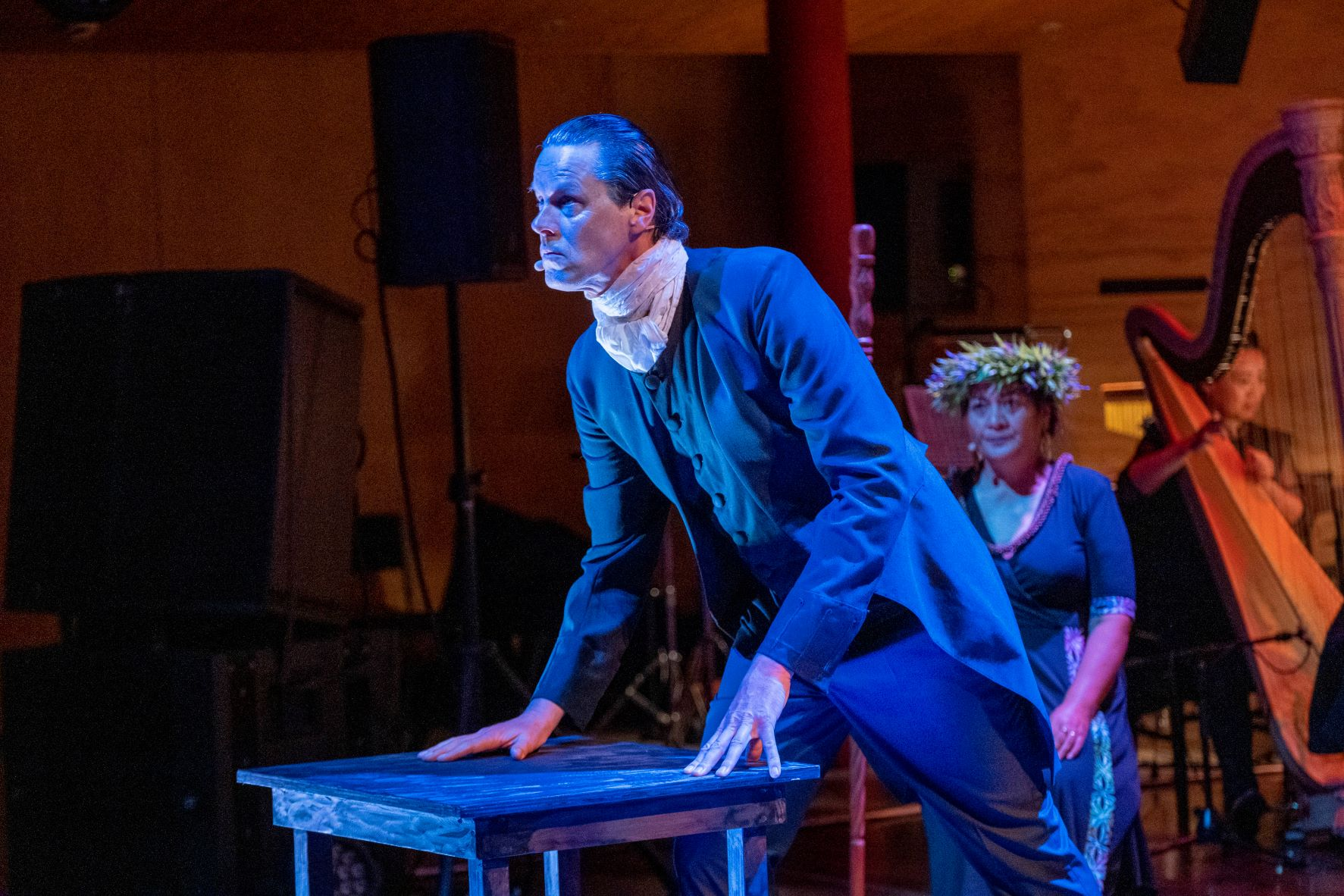
James Cook

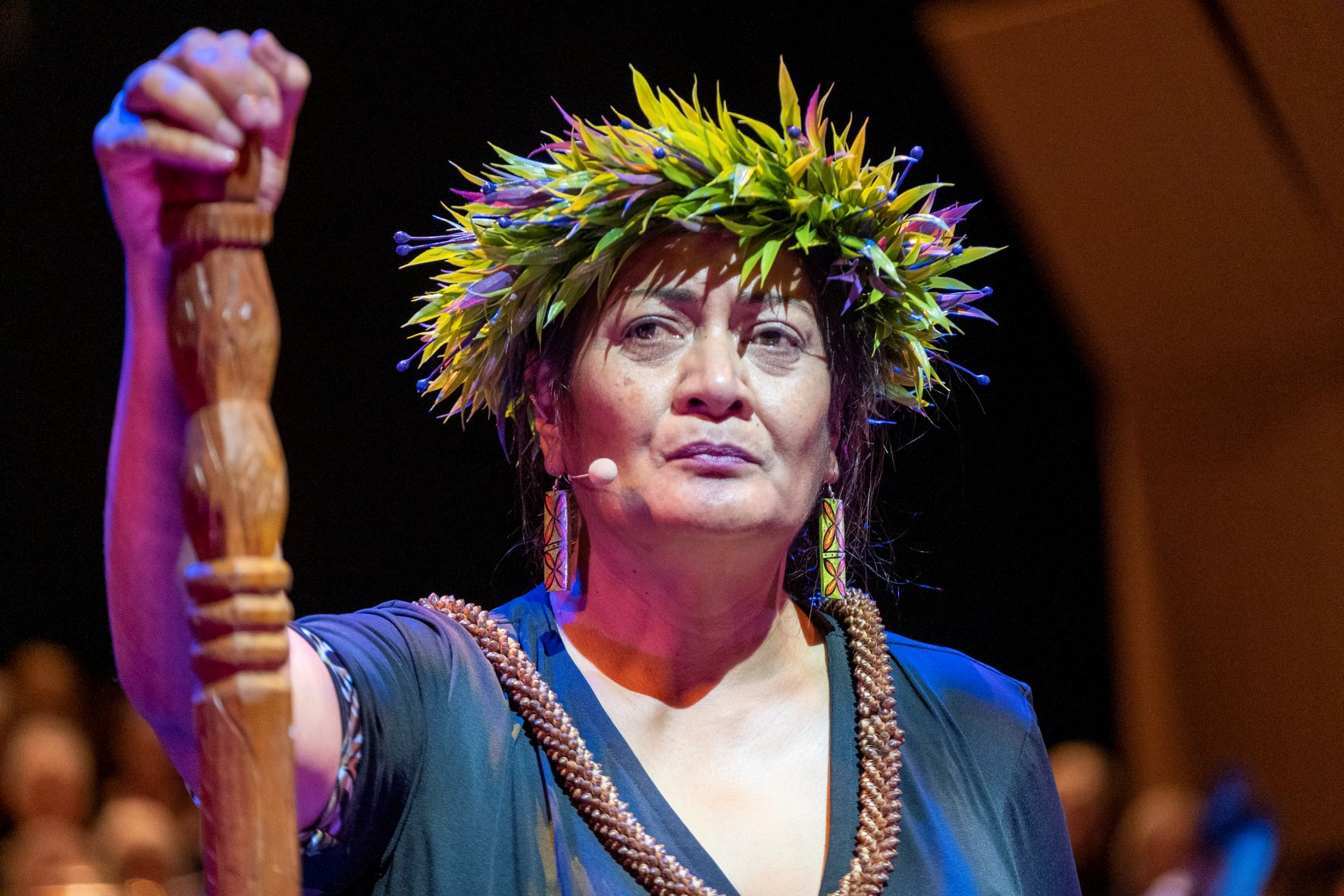
The Orator
