= Silver Clef Award =

UK annual music awards

O2 Silver Clef Awards
- Awarded for: Outstanding contribution to UK music
- Location: United Kingdom
- Presented by: Nordoff-Robbins
- Final award: 2025
- Currently held by: David Gilmour
- Website: nordoff-robbins.org.uk

The O2 Silver Clef Awards is an annual UK popular music awards lunch which has been running since 1976.

== History ==
The Silver Clef fundraising committee was founded in 1976 by musicians and managers from across the British music industry, who wanted to honour and award music artists whilst raising funds for Nordoff Robbins. The event went on to become the annual Silver Clef Awards and Lunch, an important date in the social and business calendar of the music industry, with even members of the Royal Family attending as guests of honour. The Silver Clef initiative eventually expanded to the USA, where members of the music community there arranged the first American Silver Clef Award Dinner and Auction in 1989. The funds from that event benefited the Nordoff Robbins Centre for Music Therapy based at New York University.

The 44th annual event was held in July 2019 at the Grosvenor House Hotel in London, honouring music greats including Ed Sheeran, Sam Smith and Dua Lipa, and raised £835,000.

== Personnel ==
- Committee Chair: Emma Banks

== Categories ==
- Silver Clef Award (for outstanding contribution to UK music)
- Outstanding Achievement Award
- Contemporary Music Award
- Legend Award
- Icon Award
- International Award
- Best New Music Award
- Best Group Award
- Best Female Award
- Best Male Award
- Classical Award
- Innovation Award
- Best Live Act

== List of winners ==
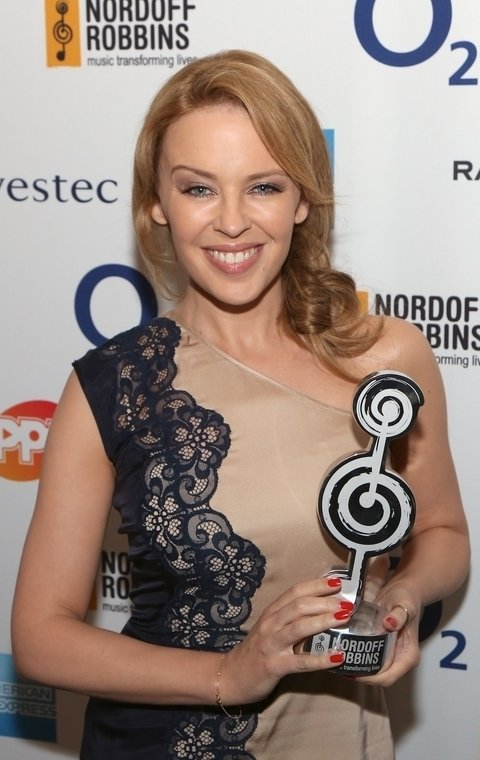
Kylie Minogue with the 25th Anniversary O2 Silver Clef Award in June 2012

=== Silver Clef Award ===
- 1976 The Who
- 1977 Genesis
- 1978 Cliff Richard and the Shadows
- 1979 Elton John
- 1980 Pink Floyd
- 1981 Status Quo
- 1982 The Rolling Stones
- 1983 Eric Clapton
- 1984 Queen
- 1985 Dire Straits
- 1986 Phil Collins
- 1987 David Bowie
- 1988 Paul McCartney
- 1989 George Michael
- 1990 Robert Plant
- 1991 Rod Stewart
- 1992 Def Leppard
- 1993 Eric Clapton
- 1994 Sting
- 1995 Take That
- 1996 Wet Wet Wet
- 1997 Elvis Costello
- 1998 Jamiroquai
- 1999 M People
- 2000 Eurythmics
- 2001 Tom Jones
- 2002 Dido
- 2003 Coldplay
- 2004 Morrissey
- 2005 The Who (30th Anniversary Award)
- 2006 Ozzy Osbourne & Sharon Osbourne
- 2007 Paul Weller
- 2008 Oasis
- 2009 Take That
- 2010 Muse
- 2011 Annie Lennox
- 2012 Kylie Minogue (25th Anniversary Award)
- 2013 The Clash
- 2014 Jimmy Page
- 2015 Iron Maiden
- 2016 Lionel Richie
- 2017 Shirley Bassey
- 2018 Roger Waters
- 2019 Ed Sheeran
- 2023 Stormzy
- 2024 Blur
- 2025 David Gilmour

=== Outstanding Achievement Award ===
- 2005 U2
- 2006 Eagles
- 2007 Clive Robbins
- 2010 Tony Bennett
- 2011 Status Quo
- 2012 Andrew Lloyd Webber
- 2013 Barry Gibb
- 2014 Tom Jones
- 2015 Duran Duran
- 2016 Patti Smith
- 2017 Blondie
- 2018 Robert Plant
- 2019 Bernard Sumner
- 2023 Neneh Cherry
- 2024 Texas
- 2025 Rick Astley

=== Contemporary Music Award ===
- 2024 Ezra Collective
- 2025 Aurora

=== Best New Music Award ===
- 1986 Curiosity Killed the Cat
- 1987 Pet Shop Boys
- 1988 Wet Wet Wet
- 1989 Fairground Attraction
- 1990 Lisa Stansfield
- 1991 James
- 1992 Right Said Fred
- 1993 Take That
- 1994 Dina Carroll
- 1995 Eternal
- 1996 Supergrass
- 1997 Kula Shaker
- 1998 Robbie Williams
- 1999 Another Level
- 2000 Five
- 2001 Craig David
- 2002 Blue
- 2003 Ms. Dynamite
- 2004 Jamie Cullum
- 2005 Razorlight
- 2005 McFly
- 2006 Editors
- 2007 Paolo Nutini
- 2008 Amy Macdonald
- 2009 La Roux
- 2010 JLS
- 2011 Tinie Tempah
- 2012 Conor Maynard
- 2013 Jessie Ware
- 2014 Laura Mvula
- 2015 James Bay
- 2016 Jess Glynne
- 2017 Anne-Marie
- 2018 Jorja Smith
- 2019 Mabel (singer)
- 2024 Cat Burns
- 2025 The Last Dinner Party

=== International Award ===
- 1992 INXS
- 1993 U2
- 1994 Jimmy Page & Robert Plant
- 1995 Bryan Adams
- 1996 AC/DC
- 1997 Vanessa-Mae
- 1998 Chris de Burgh
- 1999 The Corrs
- 2000 Ronan Keating
- 2001 Kylie Minogue
- 2002 Natalie Imbruglia
- 2003 Bon Jovi
- 2004 George Benson
- 2005 Bob Geldof
- 2006 Foo Fighters
- 2007 John Legend
- 2008 Meat Loaf
- 2009 Brian Wilson
- 2010 Kelis
- 2011 Swedish House Mafia
- 2012 Michael Bublé
- 2013 Vampire Weekend
- 2014 Pharrell Williams
- 2015 Gladys Knight
- 2016 Hozier
- 2017 Nile Rodgers
- 2018 The Script
- 2019 Black Eyed Peas

=== Classical Award ===
- 2005 Katherine Jenkins
- 2007 Andrea Bocelli
- 2008 Nicola Benedetti
- 2009 Faryl Smith
- 2010 Russell Watson
- 2011 Alfie Boe
- 2012 Laura Wright
- 2013 Alison Balsom
- 2014 Gareth Malone
- 2015 Il Divo
- 2016 André Rieu
- 2017 Alexander Armstrong
- 2018 Alfie Boe & Michael Ball
- 2019 Sheku Kanneh-Mason

=== Legend Award ===
- 2024 AC/DC
- 2025 The Corrs

=== Icon Award ===
- 1998 Sir Cliff Richard
- 1999 Madness
- 2007 Rod Stewart
- 2008 Squeeze
- 2009 Madness
- 2010 Vera Lynn
- 2011 Liza Minnelli
- 2012 Fatboy Slim
- 2013 Alison Moyet
- 2014 Chas & Dave
- 2015 Primal Scream
- 2016 Jeff Lynne
- 2017 Phil Collins
- 2018 Stereophonics
- 2023 Mark King
- 2024 Mark Knopfler
- 2025 Tony Christie

=== Best Female Award ===
- 2015 Rita Ora
- 2016 Florence Welch
- 2017 Emeli Sandé
- 2018 Ellie Goulding
- 2019 Dua Lipa
- 2023 RAYE
- 2024 Jessie Ware
- 2025 Sophie Ellis-Bextor

=== Best Male Award ===
- 2015 Jake Bugg
- 2016 Olly Murs
- 2018 George Ezra
- 2019 Sam Smith
- 2023 Gregory Porter
- 2024 Loyle Carner
- 2025 Noah Kahan

=== Best Group ===
- 2015 Kasabian
- 2016 Massive Attack
- 2017 Mumford & Sons
- 2018 Bastille
- 2019 Years and Years
- 2023 N-Dubz
- 2024 The 1975
- 2025 Chase & Status

=== Innovation Award ===
- 2008 Estelle
- 2009 N-Dubz
- 2010 Dizzee Rascal
- 2011 McFly
- 2012 Emeli Sandé
- 2013 Labrinth
- 2014 Giorgio Moroder
- 2015 Mark Ronson
- 2016 Craig David
- 2017 Pete Tong
- 2018 Rudimental
- 2019 The Chemical Brothers
- 2023 Nova Twins
- 2024 Jacob Collier
- 2025 Soul II Soul

=== Best Live Act (voted for by the public) ===
- 2011 Paul McCartney
- 2012 McFly
- 2013 One Direction
- 2014 Justin Timberlake
- 2015 Arctic Monkeys
- 2016 Take That
- 2017 Little Mix
- 2018 Harry Styles
- 2024 Young Fathers
- 2025 Idles

=== Ambassadors of Rock Award ===
- 2007 Bryan Ferry
- 2008 Bryan Adams
- 2009 Queen
- 2010 Slash
- 2011 Arcade Fire
- 2012 Manic Street Preachers
- 2013 Ray Davies
- 2014 Black Sabbath

=== Best British Act Award ===
- 2006 Kaiser Chiefs
- 2007 Snow Patrol
- 2008 The Fratellis
- 2009 Stereophonics
- 2010 Scouting for Girls
- 2011 Biffy Clyro
- 2012 Jessie J
- 2013 Coldplay
- 2014 Paloma Faith

=== World Peace Award ===
- 1997 John Lennon (posthumous)

=== Special Achievement Award ===
- 1992 Alan Freeman
- 1993 Bee Gees
- 1995 George Martin
- 1997 Chris Barber
- 1998 Deep Purple
- 1999 Pete King
- 2000 Burt Bacharach & Hal David
- 2001 Jerry Leiber and Mike Stoller
- 2002 Lulu
- 2003 Ray Davies
- 2004 Iron Maiden
- 2005 The Who
- 2006 Gary Farrow

=== Heart Record/ Artist of the Year Award ===
- 2003 Atomic Kitten
- 2004 Will Young
- 2005 Lemar (male)
- 2005 Natasha Bedingfield (female)
- 2006 Girls Aloud
- 2007 The Feeling
