= Rickson =

Rickson is both a surname and a masculine given name. It may refer to:

- Daphne Rickson, New Zealand music therapist and academic
- Ian Rickson (born 1963), British theatre and film director
- Joe Rickson (1880–1958), American actor
- Rickson Gracie (born 1958), Brazilian jiu-jitsu practitioner and mixed martial artist
- Rickson (footballer) (born 1998), Brazilian footballer
