= World Federation of Music Therapy =

The World Federation of Music Therapy (WFMT) is an international, non-profit music therapy corporation, headquartered in North Carolina in the USA. It aims to promote global awareness of both the scientific and artistic nature of the profession and advocates for the recognition of music therapy as an evidence-based profession.

== History ==
In 2010, the WFMT celebrated its 25th anniversary. The seeds for the development of the World Federation of Music Therapy were sown during the second World Congress of Music Therapy in Buenos Aires in 1976. A group of American, European, and South American music therapists met and started to develop a plan for unity and standards in the international arena of music therapy. Among the ten founding members were Rolando Benenzon (Argentina), Giovanna Mutti (Italy), Jacques Jost (France), Barbara Hesser (USA), Amelia Oldfield (UK), Ruth Bright (Australia), Heinrich Otto Moll (Germany), Rafael Colon (Puerto Rico), Clementina Nastari (Brazil), and Tadeusz Natanson (Poland). The Federation was formally established during the 5th World Congress of Music Therapy in Genoa, Italy, in 1985. Anecdotal reports about the beginnings of WFMT as well as the founder’s motivation can be found in the online journal Voices.

== WFMT leadership ==
WFMT leadership consists of 21 individuals serving in a volunteer capacity as officers, commissioners, or regional liaisons.[5] The officers are the President, Past President, Secretary, Treasurer, and the Executive Assistant. The commissioners oversee committees related to one of eight areas: education, clinical practice, global crises intervention, publications, research & ethics, public relations, DEI, and world congress organization. Regional liaisons reside in the eight WFMT global regions they represent and collect and disseminate information related to developments in the profession. The Assembly of Student Delegates consists of student leaders representing each of WFMT's global regions and is facilitated by the Executive Assistant.

== World Congresses of Music Therapy ==
The World Congress of Music Therapy is held every three years in a different country. Music therapy professionals and experts in related fields from around the world gather at the congress to share ideas, experiences, trends, and research outcomes. Formats include symposia, panels, and roundtables. The World Congress of Music Therapy is hosted by a WFMT organizational member in conjunction with a local host.

Previous congress locations include:

1. Paris, France (1974)

2. Buenos Aires, Argentina (1976)

3. San Juan, Puerto Rico (1981)

4. Paris, France (1983)

5. Genoa, Italy (1985) - Founding of the World Federation of Music Therapy (WFMT)

6. Rio de Janeiro, Brazil (1990)

7. Vitoria, Spain (1993)

8. Hamburg, Germany (1996)

9. Washington, D.C., USA (1999)

10. Oxford, England (2002)

11. Brisbane, Australia (2005)

12. Buenos Aires, Argentina (2008)

13. Seoul, South Korea (2011)

14. Vienna and Krems, Austria (2014)

15. Tsukuba, Japan (2017)

16. Pretoria, South Africa (2020)

17. Vancouver, Canada (2023)

== Awards ==
The federation makes a number of awards. Its highest award is the Lifetime Achievement Award, which has been awarded to Daphne Rickson in 2023, Clive Robbins in 2020, Barbara Wheeler in 2017, Ruth Bright in 2014, David Aldridge in 2011 and Rolando Benenzon in 2008.
