= Every Soul is a Circus =

Every Soul Is a Circus
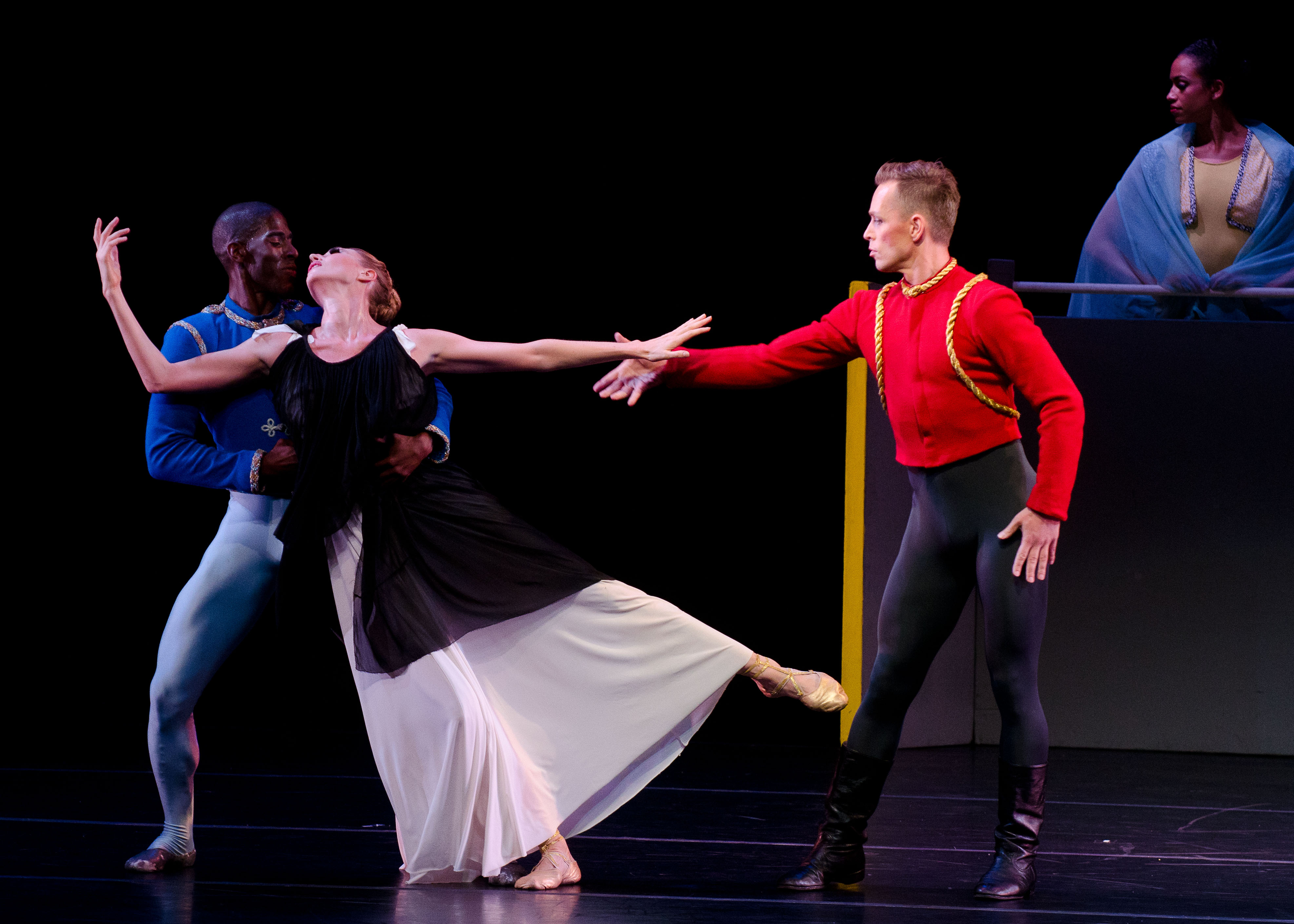
- Martha Graham Dance Company performing Every Soul Is a Circus in 2012
- Choreographer: Martha Graham
- Music: Paul Nordoff
- Premiere: 27 December 1939; St. James Theatre, New York
- Genre: Modern dance

Every Soul Is a Circus is a comedic ballet choreographed by Martha Graham. The dance premiered on December 27, 1939, at the St. James Theatre in New York City. The original score was composed by Paul Nordoff. Philip Stapp created the set. Edythe Gilfond designed the costumes. The production marked the first appearance of Merce Cunningham with the Martha Graham Dance Company.

The troupe still performs the work on occasion. It was last reprised for the 85th anniversary season in 2012.

== Title and theme ==
The title Every Soul Is a Circus is borrowed from a Vachel Lindsay poem:

Every soul is a circus
Every mind is a tent
Every heart is a sawdust ring
Where the circling race is spent.

The ballet's theme is Everywoman's inner desire to be the center of attention and the ridiculous lengths to which she will go to attain that end. As Empress of the Arena, the lead female dancer imagines herself as the star of every act. In a vignette with the Ringmaster and Acrobat, she is the apex of a love triangle. In another scene, she performs a romantic duet as the Ringmaster's beloved. But after taking her "star turn," she is ultimately humiliated by the Ringmaster. The lone spectator, the empress' alter-ego, watches as the frenzy of the circus performance builds. The empress' movements and demeanor progress from childlike to flirtatious to addled. She is finally overcome with confusion, her actions becoming ever more undignified and absurd.

== Initial reception ==
When the ballet debuted, many audiences and critics were astonished to see Graham's wry, witty side. Most of her dances were so serious, she had been dubbed "Mirthless Martha" by her musical director Louis Horst. Reviewers described her performance in Every Soul is a Circus as "poignant clowning" having a "warmth of personality", "frank and funny" and "belly-laugh provoking."

== Original cast ==
The original cast comprised the following nine performers:

- Martha Graham as the Empress of the Arena
- Erick Hawkins as the Ringmaster
- Merce Cunningham as the Acrobat
- Jean Erdman as the Ideal Spectator
- Nellie Fisher as the First Arenic Performer
- Sophie Maslow, Ethel Butler, Marjorie Mazia, Frieda Flier as Other Arenic Performers

== Structure ==
The dance is approximately 30-minutes long. The action takes place in 12 sequences. The original performers for each section were:

1. Prologue: Empress of the Arena - Martha Graham
2. The Ringmaster - Erick Hawkins
3. Parade - Nellie Fisher, Sophie Maslow, Ethel Butler, Marjorie Mazia, Frieda Flier
4. Training Ring - Martha Graham, Erick Hawkins
5. Entrance of the Spectator - Jean Erdman
6. The Show Begins: Star Turn - Martha Graham
7. Garland Entry - Sophie Maslow, Frieda Flier, Ethel Butler, Marjorie Mazia, Merce Cunningham
8. Arenic World 1. Triangle - Martha Graham, Erick Hawkins, Merce Cunningham
9. Poses and Plastiques - Nellie Fisher, Frieda Flier, Marjorie Mazia, Ethel Butler, Merce Cunningham
10. Arenic World 2. Duet - Martha Graham and Erick Hawkins
11. Aerial Interlude - Nellie Fisher, Frieda Flier, Marjorie Mazia, Ethel Butler, Merce Cunningham
12. Finale - Entire Company
