= Music therapy =

Health profession

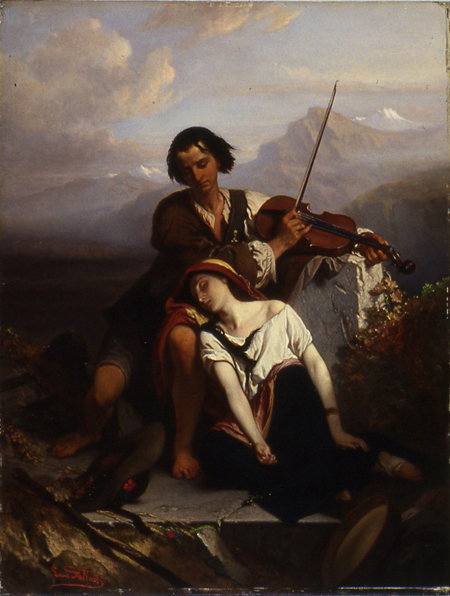
- Power of Music by Louis Gallait. A brother and sister resting before an old tomb. The brother is attempting to comfort his sibling by playing the violin, and she has fallen into a deep sleep, "oblivious of all grief, mental and physical".
- ICD-9-CM: 93.84
- MeSH: D009147

Music therapy is the use of music in a clinical setting to accomplish therapeutic goals. Music therapists are generally trained musicians who have completed an accredited music therapy program. Although established as a profession only relatively recently, the connection between music and therapy is not new.

Music therapy is a broad field, using music-based experiences to address client needs in one or more domains of human functioning: cognitive, academic, emotional/psychological, behavioral, communication, social, physiological (sensory, motor, pain, neurological and other physical systems), spiritual, or aesthetics. Music experiences are strategically designed to use the elements of music for therapeutic effects, including melody, harmony, key, mode, meter, rhythm, pitch/range, duration, timbre, form, texture, and instrumentation.

Some common music therapy practices include developmental work (communication, motor skills, etc.) with individuals with special needs, songwriting and listening in reminiscence, orientation work with the elderly, processing and relaxation work, and rhythmic brainwave entrainment for physical rehabilitation in stroke survivors. Music therapy is used in medical hospitals, cancer centers, schools, alcohol and drug recovery programs, psychiatric hospitals, nursing homes, and correctional facilities.

Music therapy is distinctive from musopathy, which relies on a more generic and non-cultural approach based on neural, physical, and other responses to the fundamental aspects of sound. Music therapy might also incorporate practices from sound healing, also known as sound immersion or sound therapy, which focuses on sound rather than song. Sound healing describes the use of vibrations and frequencies for relaxation, meditation, and other claimed healing benefits. Unlike music therapy, sound healing is unregulated and an alternative therapy.

Music therapists use their techniques to help their patients in many areas, ranging from stress relief before and after surgeries to neuropathologies such as Alzheimer's disease. Studies on people diagnosed with mental health disorders such as anxiety, depression, and schizophrenia have associated some improvements in mental health with music therapy. However, in many countries, including the United States, music therapists do not diagnose, so diagnosing mental disorders would not be within their scope of practice. The National Institute for Health and Care Excellence (NICE) has claimed that music therapy is an effective method in helping people with mental health issues, and more should be done to offer those in need of this type of help.

== Uses ==
=== Children and adolescents ===
Music therapy may be suggested for adolescent populations to help manage disorders usually diagnosed in adolescence, such as mood and anxiety disorders and eating disorders, or unpleasant behaviors, including suicide attempts, withdrawal from family, social isolation from peers, aggression, running away, and substance abuse. Goals in treating adolescents with music therapy, especially for those at high risk, often include increased recognition and awareness of emotions and moods, improved decision-making skills, opportunities for creative self expression, decreased anxiety, increased self-confidence, improved self-esteem, and better listening skills.

There is some evidence that, when combined with other types of rehabilitation, music therapy may contribute to the success rate of sensorimotor, cognitive, and communicative rehabilitation. For children and adolescents with major depressive or anxiety disorders, there is moderate to low quality evidence that music therapy added to the standard treatment, may reduce internalizing symptoms, and may be more effective than treatment without music therapy.

=== Premature infants ===
Premature infants are those born at 37 weeks after conception or earlier. Offering musical therapy to premature infants while they are in the neonatal intensive care unit (NICU) aims to both mask unwanted auditory stimuli, stimulate infant development, and promote a calm environment for families. While there are no reported adverse effects from music therapy, the evidence supporting music therapy's beneficial effects for infants is weak as many of the clinical trials that have been performed either had mixed results or were poorly designed. There is no strong evidence to suggest that music therapy improves an infant's oxygen therapy, improves sucking, or improves development when compared to usual care. There is some weaker evidence that music therapy may decrease an infants' heart rate. There is no evidence to indicate that music therapy reduces anxiety in parents of preterm infants in the NICU or information to understand what type of music therapy may be more beneficial or how for how long.

=== Medical disorders ===
Music may both motivate and provide a sense of distraction. Rhythmic stimuli has been found to help balance training for those with a brain injury.

Singing is a form of rehabilitation for neurological impairments. Neurological impairments following a brain injury can be in the form of apraxia – loss to perform purposeful movements, dysarthria, muscle control disturbances (due to damage of the central nervous system), aphasia (defect in expression causing distorted speech), or language comprehension. It is shown that patients with schizophrenia have altered feeling on major and minor chord. Singing training has been found to improve lung, speech clarity, and coordination of speech muscles, thus, accelerating rehabilitation of such neurological impairments. For example, melodic intonation therapy is the practice of communicating with others by singing to enhance speech or increase speech production by promoting socialization, and emotional expression. After a stroke, music therapy may be a useful tool for the recovery of motor skills. Listening to music may improve heart rate, respiratory rate, and blood pressure in those with coronary heart disease (CHD). In addition, there is tentative evidence that music interventions led by a trained music therapist may have positive effects on psychological and physical outcomes in adults with cancer. The effectiveness of music therapy for children with cancer is not known.

==== Autism ====
Music may help people with autism hone their motor and attention skills as well as healthy neurodevelopment of socio-communication and interaction skills. Music therapy may also contribute to improved selective attention, speech production, and language processing and acquisition in people with autism. Music therapy may benefit the family as a whole. Some family members of children with autism claim that music therapy sessions have allowed their child to interact more with the family and the world. Music therapy is also beneficial in that it gives children an outlet to use outside of the sessions. Some children after participating in music therapy may want to keep making music long after the sessions end.

==== Dementia ====
Like many of the other disorders mentioned, some of the most common significant effects of dementia can be seen in social behaviors, leading to improvements in interaction, conversation, and other such skills. A study of over 330 subjects showed that music therapy produces highly significant improvements in social behaviors, overt behaviors like wandering and restlessness, reductions in agitated behaviors, and improvements to cognitive defects, measured with reality orientation and face recognition tests. The effectiveness of the treatment seems to be strongly dependent on the patient and the quality and length of treatment.

A meta-study examined the proposed neurological mechanisms behind music therapy's effects on these patients. Many authors suspect that music has a soothing effect on the patient by affecting how noise is perceived: music renders noise familiar, or buffers the patient from overwhelming or extraneous noise in their environment. Others suggest that music acts like a mediator for social interactions, providing a vessel through which to interact with others without requiring much cognitive load.

==== Aphasia ====
Broca's aphasia, or non-fluent aphasia, is a language disorder caused by damage to Broca's area and surrounding regions in the left frontal lobe. Those with non-fluent aphasia are able to understand language fairly well, they struggle with language production and syntax.

Neurologist Oliver Sacks studied neurological oddities in people, trying to understand how the brain works. He concluded that people with some type of frontal lobe damage often "produced not only severe difficulties with expressive language (aphasia) but a strange access of musicality with incessant whistling, singing and a passionate interest in music. For him, this was an example of normally suppressed brain functions being released by damage to others". Sacks had a genuine interest in trying to help people affected with neurological disorders and other phenomena associated with music, and how it can provide access to otherwise unreachable emotional states, revivify neurological avenues that have been frozen, evoke memories of earlier, lost events or states of being and attempts to bring those with neurological disorders back to a time when the world was much richer for them. He was a firm believer that music has the power to heal.

Melodic intonation therapy (MIT), developed in 1973 by neurological researchers Sparks, Helm and Albert, is a method used by music therapists and speech–language pathologists to help people with communication disorders caused by damage to the left hemisphere of the brain by engaging the singing abilities and possibly engaging language-capable regions in the undamaged right hemisphere.

While unable to speak fluently, patients with non-fluent aphasia are often able to sing words, phrases, and even sentences they cannot express otherwise. MIT harnesses the singing ability of patients with non-fluent aphasia as a means to improve their communication. Although its exact nature depends on the therapist, in general MIT relies on the use of intonation (the rising and falling of the voice) and rhythm (beat/speed) to train patients to produce phrases verbally. In MIT, common words and phrases are turned into melodic phrases, generally starting with two step sing-song patterns and eventually emulating typical speech intonation and rhythmic patterns. A therapist will usually begin by introducing an intonation to their patient through humming. They will accompany this humming with a rhythm produced by the tapping of the left hand. At the same time, the therapist will introduce a visual stimuli of the written phrase to be learned. The therapist then sings the phrase with the patient, and ideally the patient is eventually able to sing the phrase on their own. With much repetition and through a process of "inner-rehearsal" (practicing internally hearing one's voice singing), a patient may eventually be able to produce the phrase verbally without singing. As the patient advances in therapy, the procedure can be adapted to give them more autonomy and to teach them more complex phrases. Through the use of MIT, a non-fluent aphasic patient can be taught numerous phrases which aid them to communicate and function during daily life.

The mechanisms of this success are yet to be fully understood. It is commonly agreed that while speech is lateralized mostly to the left hemisphere (for right-handed and most left-handed individuals), some speech functionality is also distributed in the right hemisphere. MIT is thought to stimulate these right language areas through the activation of music processing areas also in the right hemisphere Similarly, the rhythmic tapping of the left hand stimulates the right sensorimotor cortex to further engage the right hemisphere in language production. Overall, by stimulating the right hemisphere during language tasks, therapists hope to decrease dependence on the left hemisphere for language production.

While results are somewhat contradictory, studies have in fact found increased right hemispheric activation in non-fluent aphasic patients after MIT. This change in activation has been interpreted as evidence of decreased dependence on the left hemisphere. There is debate, however, as to whether changes in right hemispheric activation are part of the therapeutic process during/after MIT, or are simply a side effect of non-fluent aphasia. In hopes of making MIT more effective, researchers are continually studying the mechanisms of MIT and non-fluent aphasia.

=== Mental health ===
There is weak evidence to suggest that people with schizophrenia may benefit from the addition of music therapy along with their other standard treatment regime. Potential improvements include decreased aggression, fewer hallucinations and delusions, social functioning, and quality of life of people with schizophrenia or schizophrenia-like disorders. In addition, moderate-to-low-quality evidence suggests that music therapy as an addition to standard care improves mental state (including negative and general symptoms). Further research using standardized music therapy programs and consistent monitoring protocols are necessary to understand the effectiveness of this approach for adults with schizophrenia. Music therapy may be a useful tool for helping treat people with post-traumatic stress disorder; however, more rigorous empirical study is required.

For adults with depressive symptoms, there is some weak evidence to suggest that music therapy may help reduce symptoms, with recreative music therapy and guided imagery and music being superior to other methods in reducing depressive symptoms.

In the use of music therapy for adults, "music medicine", in which prerecorded music is treated like a medicine, may be employed. Music therapy may also use "receptive music therapy" using "music-assisted relaxation" and using images connecting to the music.

There is some discussion on the process of change facilitated by musical activities on mental wellness. Scholars proposed a six-dimensional framework, which contains emotional, psychological, social, cognitive, behavioral and spiritual aspects. Through conducting interview sessions with mental health service users (with mood disorders, anxiety disorders, schizophrenia and other psychotic disorders), their study showed the relevance of the six-dimensional framework.

Music therapy has been used to help bring improvements to mental health among people of all age groups. It has been used as far back as the 1830s. For example, the Hanwell Lunatic Asylum provided "music and movement sessions and musical performances" as well as "group and individual music therapy for patients with serious mental illness or emotional problems." Two main categories of music therapy were used in this study; analytic music therapy and Nordoff-Robbins music therapy. Analytic music therapy involves both words and music, while Nordoff-Robbins music therapy places great emphasis on assessing how clients react to music therapy and how the use of this type of therapy can be constantly altered and shifted to allow it to benefit the client the most.

=== Bereavement ===
The DSM-IV TR (Diagnostic and Statistical Manual of Mental Disorders) lists bereavement as a mental health diagnosis when the focus of clinical attention is related to the loss of a loved one and when symptoms of Major Depressive Disorder are present for up to two months. Music therapy models have been found to be successful in treating grief and bereavement.

==== Grief treatment for adolescents ====
Grief treatment is very valuable within the adolescent age group. Just as adults and the elderly struggle with grief from loss, relationship issues, job-related stress, and financial issues, so do adolescents also experience grief from disappointments that occur early on in life, however different these disappointing life events may be. For example, many people of adolescent age experience life-altering events such as parental divorce, trauma from emotional or physical abuse, struggles within school, and loss. If this grief is not acted upon early on through the use of some kind of therapy, it can alter the entire course of an adolescent's life. In one particular study on the impact of music therapy on grief management within adolescents used songwriting to allow these adolescents to express what they were feeling through lyrics and instrumentals. The results of the study Development of the Grief Process Scale through music therapy songwriting with bereaved adolescents demonstrate that in all of the treatment groups combined, the mean GPS (grief process scale) score decreased by 43%. The use of music therapy songwriting allowed these adolescents to become less overwhelmed with grief and better able to process it as demonstrated by the decrease in mean GPS score

== Methods ==
=== Children and adolescents ===
Among adolescents, group meetings and individual sessions are the main methods for music therapy. Both methods may include listening to music, discussing concerning moods and emotions in or toward music, analyzing the meanings of specific songs, writing lyrics, composing or performing music, and musical improvisation.

Private individual sessions can provide personal attention and are most effective when using music preferred by the patient. Using music that adolescents can relate to or connect with can help adolescent patients view the therapist as safe and trustworthy, and to engage in therapy with less resistance. Music therapy conducted in groups allows adolescent individuals to feel a sense of belonging, express their opinions, learn how to socialize and verbalize appropriately with peers, improve compromising skills, and develop tolerance and empathy. Group sessions that emphasize cooperation and cohesion can be effective in working with adolescents.

Music therapy intervention programs typically include about 18 sessions of treatment. The achievement of a physical rehabilitation goal relies on the child's existing motivation and feelings towards music and their commitment to engage in meaningful, rewarding efforts. Regaining full functioning also confides in the prognosis of recovery, the condition of the client, and the environmental resources available. Both techniques use systematic processes where the therapists assist the client by using musical experiences and connections that collaborate as a dynamic force of change toward rehabilitation.

=== Assessment ===
Assessment includes obtaining a full medical history, current non-musical functioning (social, physical/motor, emotional, etc.) and goals, musical (ability to duplicate a melody or identify changes in rhythm, etc.) and a determination of the potential for music therapy to be effective in addressing goals.

=== Types of interventions ===
Though music therapy practice employs a large number of intervention techniques, some of the most commonly used interventions include improvisation, therapeutic singing, therapeutic instrumental music playing, music-facilitated reminiscence and life review, songwriting, music-facilitated relaxation, and lyric analysis. While there has been no conclusive research done on the comparison of interventions the use of particular interventions is individualized to each client based upon thorough assessment of needs, and the effectiveness of treatment may not rely on the type of intervention.,

Improvisation in music therapy allows for clients to make up, or alter, music as they see fit. While improvisation is an intervention in a methodical practice, it does allow for some freedom of expression, which is what it is often used for. Improvisation has several other clinical goals as well, which can also be found on the Improvisation in music therapy page, such as: facilitating verbal and nonverbal communication, self-exploration, creating intimacy, teamwork, developing creativity, and improving cognitive skills. Building on these goals, Botello and Krout designed a cognitive behavioral application to assess and improve communication in couples. Further research is needed before the use of improvisation is conclusively proven to be effective in this application, but there were positive signs in this study of its use.

Singing or playing an instrument is often used to help clients express their thoughts and feelings in a more structured manner than improvisation and can also allow participation with only limited knowledge of music. Singing in a group can facilitate a sense of community and can also be used as group ritual to structure a theme of the group or of treatment,

Research that compares types of music therapy intervention has been inconclusive. Music Therapists use lyric analysis in a variety of ways, but typically lyric analysis is used to facilitate dialogue with clients based on the lyrics, which can then lead to discussion that addresses the goals of therapy.

== Empirical evidence ==
Since 2017, providing evidence-based practice has grown more important, and music therapy has been continuously critiqued and regulated to provide that desired evidence-based practice. A number of research studies and meta-analyses have been conducted on, or included, music therapy and all have found that music therapy has at least some promising effects, especially when used for the treatment of grief and bereavement. The AMTA has largely supported the advancement of music therapy through research that would promote evidenced-based practice. With the definition of evidence-based health care as "the conscientious use of current best evidence in making decisions about the care of individual patients or the delivery of health services, current best evidence is up-to-date information from relevant, valid research about the effects of different forms of health care, the potential for harm from exposure to particular agents, the accuracy of diagnostic tests, and the predictive power of prognostic factors".

Qualitative and quantitative research on music therapy in bereavement is ongoing. Recent systematic reviews indicate music therapy may assist people to work through grief, express emotion and improve mood following bereavement; however moderators of responses and quality of evidence are limited and more high quality trials are required. For instance, a 2024 systematic review concluded that structured music interventions were associated with significantly less grief-related distress than standard supportive interventions such as counseling or psychotherapy. Yet another study completed by Russel Hilliard (2007), looked at the effects of Orff-based music therapy and social work groups on childhood grief symptoms and behaviors. Using a control group that consisted of wait-listed clients, and employing the Behavior Rating Index for Children and the bereavement Group Questionnaire for Parents and Guardians as measurement tools, it was found that children who were in the music therapy group showed significant improvement in grief symptoms and also showed some improvement in behaviors compared to the control group, whereas the social work group also showed significant improvement in both grief and behaviors compared to the control group. The study concludes with support for music therapy as a medium from bereavement groups for children (Hilliard, 2007).

Two recent meta-analyses again support the potential of music therapy to reduce symptoms of anxiety in mixed clinical and non-clinical populations. A 2025 systematic review for music therapy and anxiety of RCTs found that interventions by trained music therapists significantly reduced state anxiety in children and adults who were receiving medical, psychological or community care.

There is also evidence for music therapy's promise in treating depression, particularly when it is added to standard care. In a meta-analysis up to 2025, adjunctive music therapy was associated with small to moderate reductions in depressive symptoms versus usual care alone, but evidence certainty is low overall as study designs and sample sizes varied. Previous reviews, as well as a Cochrane review, also demonstrated benefits for mood and affect regulation, indicating that music therapy is a supportive intervention rather than an independent treatment.

Research on the use of music therapy for individuals with dementia and other cognitive impairments has returned mixed yet promising outcomes. A 2023 systematic review of RCTs concluded that structured music-based interventions were connected to better global cognition, memory and communication aspects in AD patients and could be improved when sessions include active participation (like singing or playing an instrument). However, a 2025 Cochrane review found that the overall certainty was low, due to potential methodological limitations and variability of results and proof was still insufficient on whether or not performing music therapy affects regular cognitive functions.

== Types of music therapy ==
Two fundamental types of music therapy are receptive music therapy and active music therapy (also known as expressive music therapy). Active music therapy engages clients or patients in the act of making music, whereas receptive music therapy guides patients or clients in listening or responding to live or recorded music. Either or both can lead to verbal discussions, depending on client needs and the therapist's orientation.

=== Receptive ===
Receptive music therapy involves listening to recorded or live genres of music such as classical, rock, jazz, and/or country music. In receptive music therapy, patients are the recipient of the music experience, meaning that they are actively listening and responding to the music rather than creating it. During music sessions, patients participate in song discussion, music relaxation, and are given the ability to listen to their preferred music genre. It can improve mood, decrease stress, decrease pain, enhance relaxation, and decrease anxiety; this can help with coping skills. There is also evidence of biochemical changes (e.g., lowered cortisol levels).

=== Active ===
In active music therapy, patients engage in some form of music-making (e.g., vocalizing, rapping, chanting, singing, playing instruments, improvising, song writing, composing, or conducting). Researchers at Baylor, Scott, and White Universities are studying the effect of harmonica playing on patients with COPD to determine if it helps improve lung function. Another example of active music therapy takes place in a nursing home in Japan: therapists teach the elderly how to play easy-to-use instruments so they can overcome physical difficulties.

== Models and approaches ==
Music therapist Kenneth Bruscia stated: "A model is a comprehensive approach to assessment, treatment, and evaluation that includes theoretical principles, clinical indications and contraindications, goals, methodological guidelines and specifications, and the characteristic use of certain procedural sequences and techniques." In the literature, the terms model, orientation, or approach might be encountered and may have slightly different meanings. Regardless, music therapists use both psychology models and models specific to music therapy. The theories these models are based on include beliefs about human needs, causes of distress, and how humans grow or heal.

Models developed specifically for music therapy include analytical music therapy, Benenzon, the Bonny Method of Guided Imagery and Music (GIM), community music therapy, Nordoff-Robbins music therapy (creative music therapy), neurologic music therapy, and vocal psychotherapy.

Psychological orientations used in music therapy include psychodynamic, cognitive behavioral, humanistic, existential, and the biomedical model.

=== The Bonny Method of Guided Imagery and Music ===
To be trained in this method, students are required to be healthcare professionals. Some courses are only open to music therapists and mental health professionals.

Music educator and therapist Helen Lindquist Bonny (1921–2010) developed an approach influenced by humanistic and transpersonal psychological views, known as the Bonny Method of guided imagery in music (BGIM or GIM). Guided imagery refers to a technique used in natural and alternative medicine that involves using mental imagery to help with the physiological and psychological ailments of patients.

The practitioner often suggests a relaxing and focusing image, and through the use of imagination and discussion, they aim to find constructive solutions to manage their problems. Bonny applied this psychotherapeutic method to the field of music therapy by using music as the means of guiding the patient to a higher state of consciousness where healing and constructive self-awareness can take place. Music is considered a "co-therapist" because of its importance. GIM with children can be used in one-on-one or group settings, and involves relaxation techniques, identification and sharing of personal feeling states, and improvisation to discover the self, and foster growth. The choice of music is carefully selected for the client based on their musical preferences and the goals of the session. The piece is usually classical, and it must reflect the age and attention abilities of the child in length and genre. A full explanation of the exercises must be offered at their level of understanding.

=== Nordoff-Robbins ===
Paul Nordoff, a Juilliard School graduate and Professor of Music, was a pianist and composer who, upon seeing disabled children respond so positively to music, gave up his academic career to further investigate the possibility of music as a means for therapy. Clive Robbins, a special educator, partnered with Nordoff for more than 17 years in the exploration and research of music's effects on disabled children—first in the UK, and then in the United States in the 1950s and 60s. Their pilot projects included placements at care units for autistic children and child psychiatry departments, where they put programs in place for children with mental disorders, emotional disturbances, developmental delays, and other handicaps. Their success at establishing a means of communication and relationship with children with cognitive impairments at the University of Pennsylvania gave rise to the National Institutes of Health's first grant given of this nature, and the 5-year study "Music therapy project for psychotic children under seven at the day care unit" involved research, publication, training and treatment. Several publications, including Therapy in Music for Handicapped Children, Creative Music Therapy, Music Therapy in Special Education, as well as instrumental and song books for children, were released during this time. Nordoff and Robbins's success became known globally in the mental health community, and they were invited to share their findings and offer training on an international tour that lasted several years. Funds were granted to support the founding of the Nordoff Robbins Music Therapy Centre in Great Britain in 1974, where a one-year graduate program for students was implemented. In the early eighties, a center was opened in Australia, and various programs and institutes for music therapy were founded in Germany and other countries. In the United States, the Nordoff-Robbins Center for Music Therapy was established at New York University in 1989

Today, Nordoff-Robbins is a music therapy Theoretical Model / Approach. The Nordoff-Robbins approach, based on the belief that everyone is capable of finding meaning in and benefiting from musical experience, is now practiced by hundreds of therapists internationally. This approach focuses on treatment through the creation of music by both therapist and client together. The therapist uses various techniques so that even the most low functioning individuals can actively participate.

=== Orff Music Therapy ===
Gertrude Orff developed Orff Music Therapy at the Kinderzentrum München. Both the clinical setting of social pediatrics and the Orff Schulwerk (schoolwork) approach in music education (developed by German composer Carl Orff) influence this method, which is used with children with developmental problems, delays, and disabilities. Theodor Hellbrügge developed the area of social pediatrics in Germany after the Second World War. He understood that medicine alone could not meet the complex needs of developmentally disabled children. Hellbrügge consulted psychologists, occupational therapists and other mental healthcare professionals whose knowledge and skills could aid in the diagnostics and treatment of children. Gertrude Orff was asked to develop a form of therapy based on the Orff Schulwerk approach to support the emotional development of patients. Elements found in both the music therapy and education approaches include the understanding of holistic music presentation as involving word, sound and movement, the use of both music and play improvisation as providing a creative stimulus for the child to investigate and explore, Orff instrumentation, including keyboard instruments and percussion instruments as a means of participation and interaction in a therapeutic setting, and the multisensory aspects of music used by the therapist to meet the particular needs of the child, such as both feeling and hearing sound.

Corresponding with the attitudes of humanistic psychology, the developmental potential of the child, as in the acknowledgement of their strengths as well as their handicaps, and the importance of the therapist-child relationship, are central factors in Orff music therapy. The strong emphasis on social integration and the involvement of parents in the therapeutic process found in social pediatrics also influence theoretical foundations. Knowledge of developmental psychology puts into perspective how developmental disabilities influence the child, as do their social and familial environments. The basis for interaction in this method is known as responsive interaction, in which the therapist meets the child at their level and responds according to their initiatives, combining both humanistic and developmental psychology philosophies. Involving the parents in this type of interaction by having them participate directly or observe the therapist's techniques equips the parents with ideas of how to interact appropriately with their child, thus fostering a positive parent-child relationship.

=== Liberation Music Therapy ===
Liberation Music Therapy (LMT) is an emancipatory approach to music-making that integrates healing, social justice, and revolutionary change. Rooted in the principles of liberation psychology and influenced by the global history of music's role in communal and spiritual practices, LMT challenges traditional, colonialist frameworks of mental health care. It emphasizes addressing systemic oppression and transgenerational trauma through culturally relevant music practices, particularly within marginalized communities. LMT practitioners view music not only as a therapeutic tool but as a form of activism and resistance, fostering solidarity, critical consciousness (concientización), and community empowerment.

This approach combines music's therapeutic qualities with its capacity for social and political transformation, drawing on a variety of influences, including folk traditions, hip-hop, drumming, and chanting, alongside modern and classical genres. Through methods such as lyric analysis, improvisation, and collective musicking, LMT bridges personal emotional experiences with broader societal struggles, engaging individuals and communities in processes of healing and liberation. Practitioners work collaboratively, meeting communities where they are and respecting their cultural genius, with the ultimate aim of fostering both individual well-being and collective resilience.

== Cultural aspects ==
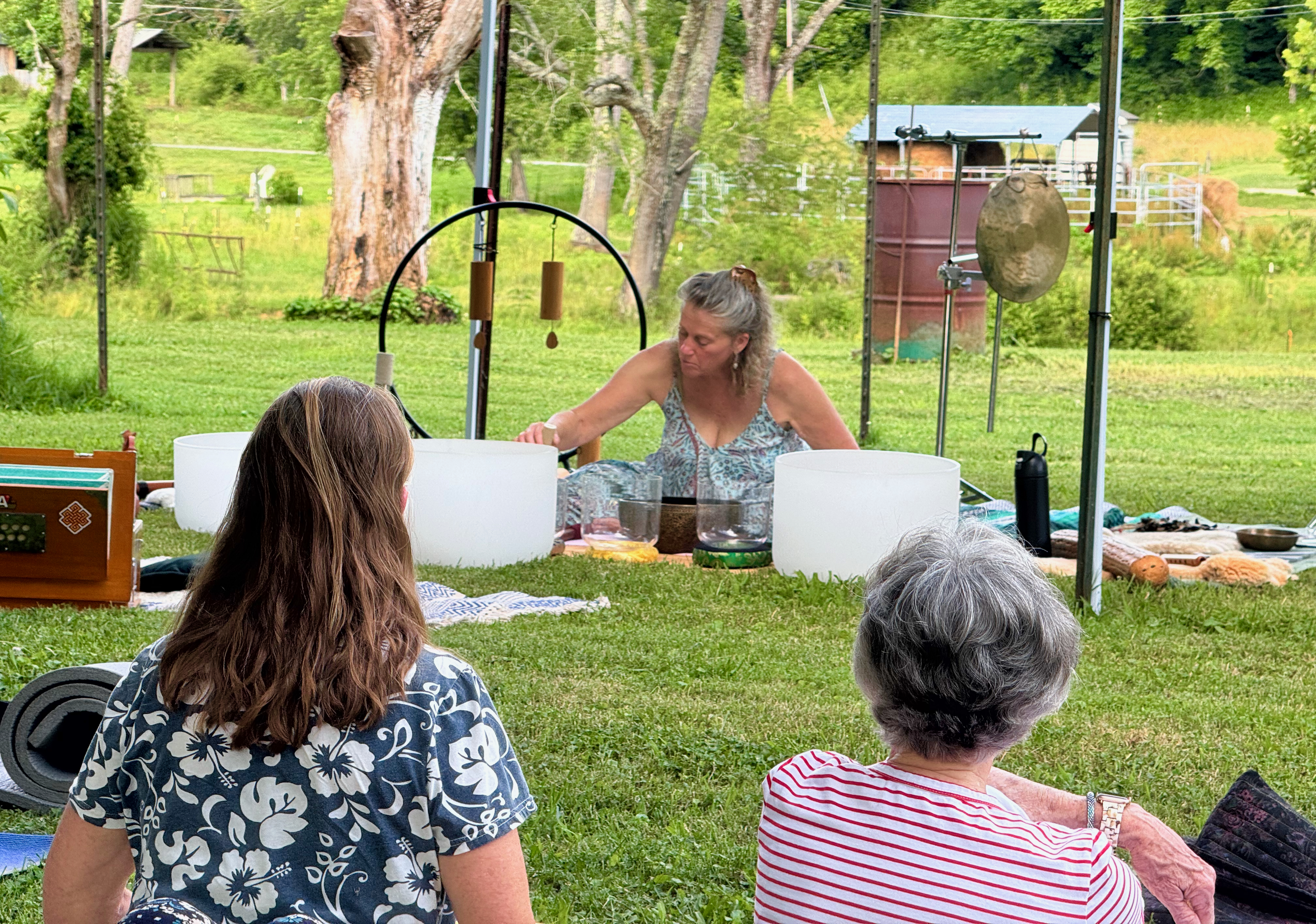
A sound bath is performed by a sound healing practitioner in Peachtree, North Carolina

Through the ages music has been an integral component of rituals, ceremonies, healing practices, and spiritual and cultural traditions. Further, Michael Bakan, author of World Music: Traditions and Transformations, states that "Music is a mode of cultural production and can reveal much about how the culture works," something ethnomusicologists study.

The 21st century is a culturally pluralistic world. In some countries, such as the United States, an individual may have multiple cultural identities that are quite different from the music therapist's. These include race; ethnicity, culture, and/or heritage; religion; sex; ability/disability; education; or socioeconomic status. Music therapists strive to achieve multicultural competence through a lifelong journey of formal and informal education and self-reflection. Multicultural therapy "uses modalities and defines goals consistent with the life experiences and cultural values of clients" rather than basing therapy on the therapist's worldview or the dominant culture's norms.

Empathy in general is an important aspect of any mental health practitioner and the same is true for music therapists, as is multicultural awareness. It is the added complexity to cultural empathy that comes from adding music that provides both the greater risk and potential to provide exceptional culturally sensitive therapy (Valentino, 2006). An extensive knowledge of a culture is really needed to provide this effective treatment as providing culturally sensitive music therapy goes beyond knowing the language of speech, the country, or even some background about the culture. Simply choosing music that is from the same country of origin or that has the same spoken language is not effective for providing music therapy as music genres vary as do the messages each piece of music sends. Also, different cultures view and use music in various ways and may not always be the same as how the therapist views and uses music. Melody Schwantes and her colleagues wrote an article that describes the effective use of the Mexican "corrido" in a bereavement group of Mexican migrant farm workers (Schwantes, Wigram, Lipscomb & Richards, 2011). This support group was dealing with the loss of two of their coworkers after an accident they were in and so the corrido, a song form traditionally used for telling stories of the deceased. An important element that was also mentioned was that songwriting has shown to be a large cultural artifact in many cultures, and that there are many subtle messages and thoughts provided in songs that would otherwise be hard to identify. Lastly, the authors of this study stated that "Given the position and importance of songs in all cultures, the example in this therapeutic process demonstrates the powerful nature of lyrics and music to contain and express difficult and often unspoken feelings" (Schwantes et al., 2011).

== Usage by region ==
=== Africa ===
In 1999, the first program for music therapy in Africa opened in Pretoria, South Africa. Research has shown that in Tanzania patients can receive palliative care for life-threatening illnesses directly after the diagnosis of these illnesses. This is different from many Western countries, because they reserve palliative care for patients who have an incurable illness. Music is also viewed differently between Africa and Western countries. In Western countries and a majority of other countries throughout the world, music is traditionally seen as entertainment whereas in many African cultures, music is used in recounting stories, celebrating life events, or sending messages.

=== Australia ===
During 1949, music therapy (not clinical music therapy as understood today) was started through concerts organized by the Australian Red Cross along with a Red Cross Music Therapy Committee in Australia. The key Australian body, the Australian Music Therapy Association (AMTA), was founded in 1975.

==== Aboriginal people ====
One of the first groups known to heal with sound were the aboriginal people of Australia. The modern name of their healing tool is the didgeridoo, but it was originally called the yidaki. The yidaki produced sounds that are similar to the sound healing techniques used in modern day. The sound of the didgeridoo produces a low, bass frequency. For at least 40,000 years, the healing tool was believed to assist in healing "broken bones, muscle tears and illnesses of every kind". However, here are no reliable sources stating the didgeridoo's exact age. Archaeological studies of rock art in Northern Australia suggest that the people of the Kakadu region of the Northern Territory have been using the didgeridoo for less than 1,000 years, based on the dating of paintings on cave walls and shelters from this period. A clear rock painting in Ginga Wardelirrhmeng, on the northern edge of the Arnhem Land plateau, from the freshwater period (that had begun 1500 years ago) shows a didgeridoo player and two songmen participating in an Ubarr ceremony.

=== Canada ===
In 1956, Fran Herman, one of Canada's music therapy pioneers, began a 'remedial music' program at the Home For Incurable Children, now known as the Holland Bloorview Kids Rehabilitation Hospital, in Toronto. Her group 'The Wheelchair Players' continued until 1964, and is considered to be the first music therapy group project in Canada. Its production "The Emperor's Nightingale" was the subject of a documentary film.

Composer/pianist Alfred Rosé, a professor at the University of Western Ontario, also pioneered the use of music therapy in London, Ontario, at Westminster Hospital in 1952 and at the London Psychiatric Hospital in 1956.

Two other music therapy programs were initiated during the 1950s; one by Norma Sharpe at St. Thomas Psychiatric Hospital in St. Thomas, Ontario, and the other by Thérèse Pageau at the Hôpital St-Jean-de-Dieu (now Hôpital Louis-Hippolyte Lafontaine) in Montreal.

A conference in August 1974, organized by Norma Sharpe and six other music therapists, led to the founding of the Canadian Music Therapy Association, which was later renamed the Canadian Association for Music Therapy (CAMT). As of 2009, the organization had more than 500 members.

Canada's first music therapy training program was founded in 1976, at Capilano College (now Capilano University) in North Vancouver, by Nancy McMaster and Carolyn Kenny.

=== China ===
The relationship between music therapy and health has long been documented in ancient China.

It is said that in ancient times, really good traditional Chinese medicine did not use acupuncture or traditional Chinese medicine, but music: at the end of a song, people were safe when they were discharged. As early as before the Spring and Autumn period and the Warring States period, the Yellow Emperor's Canon of internal medicine believed that the five tones (Palace, Shang, horn, emblem and feather) belonged to the five elements (gold, wood, water, fire and earth), and were associated with five basic emotions (joy, anger, worry, thought and fear), that is, the five chronicles. Different music such as palace, Shang, horn, micro and feather were used to target different diseases.

More than 2000 years ago, the book Yue Ji also talked about the important role of music in regulating life harmony and improving health; "Zuo Zhuan" recorded the famous doctors of the state of Qin and the discussion that music can prevent and treat diseases: "there are six or seven days, the hair is colorless, the emblem is five colors, and sex produces six diseases." It is emphasized that silence should be controlled and appropriate in order to have a beneficial regulating effect on the human body; The book "the soul and the body flow, the spirit also flows"; Zhang Jingyue and Xu Lingtai, famous medical experts in the Ming and Qing Dynasties, also specially discussed phonology and medicine in the "classics with wings" and "Yuefu Chuansheng".

For example, Liu Xueyu, one of the emperors of the Tang Dynasty, cured some stubborn diseases through the records of music in the Tang Dynasty.

Chinese contemporary music therapy began in the 1980s. In 1984, Professor Zhang Boyuan of the Department of psychology of Peking University published the experimental report on the research of physical and mental defense of music, which was the first published scientific research article on music therapy in China. In 1986, Professor Gao Tian of Beijing Conservatory of music published his paper "Research on the relieving effect of music on pain";

In 1989, the Chinese society of therapeutics was officially established. In 1994, pukaiyuan published his monograph music therapy. In 1995, he Huajun and Lu Tingzhu published a monograph music therapy. In 2000, Zhang Hongyi edited and published fundamentals of music therapy. In 2002, fan Xinsheng edited and published music therapy. In 2007, Gao Tian edited and published the basic theory of music therapy.

In short, Chinese music therapy has made rapid progress in theoretical research, literature review and clinical research. In addition, the music therapy methods under the guidance of ancient Chinese music therapy theory and traditional Chinese medicine theory with a long history have attracted worldwide attention. The prospect of Chinese music therapy is broad.

=== Germany ===
The Germany Music Therapy Society defines music therapy as the "targeted use of music as part of a therapeutic relationship to restore, maintain and promote mental, physical and cognitive health [Musiktherapie ist der gezielte Einsatz von Musik im Rahmen der therapeutischen Beziehung zur Wiederherstellung, Erhaltung und Förderung seelischer, körperlicher und geistiger Gesundheit]."

=== India ===
The roots of musical therapy in India can be traced back to ancient Hindu mythology, Vedic texts, and local folk traditions. An example of a practice dating back to Vedic texts would be, Nada Yoga. Nada yoga has been a practice in India for a long time, and it is to heal by listening to the body's inner vibrations(Bhanu, Y. 2022). It is very possible that music therapy has been used for hundreds of years in Indian culture. In the 1990s, another dimension to this, known as Musopathy, was postulated by Indian musician Chitravina Ravikiran based on fundamental criteria derived from acoustic physics.

The Indian Association of Music Therapy was established in 2010 by Dr. Dinesh C. Sharma with a motto "to use pleasant sounds in a specific manner like drug in due course of time as green medicine". He also published the International Journal of Music Therapy (ISSN 2249-8664) to popularize and promote music therapy research on an international platform.

Suvarna Nalapat has studied music therapy in the Indian context. Her books Nadalayasindhu-Ragachikitsamrutam (2008), Music Therapy in Management Education and Administration (2008) and Ragachikitsa (2008) are accepted textbooks on music therapy and Indian arts.

The Music Therapy Trust of India is another venture in the country. It was started by Margaret Lobo. She is the founder and director of the Otakar Kraus Music Trust and her work began in 2004.

=== Lebanon ===
In 2006, Hamda Farhat introduced music therapy to Lebanon, developing and inventing therapeutic methods such as the triple method to treat hyperactivity, depression, anxiety, addiction, and post traumatic stress disorder. She has met with great success in working with many international organizations, and in the training of therapists, educators, and doctors. The Lebanese Association Of Music Therapy L.A.M.T ref number 65 is the only reference at Lebanon, the president Dr Hamda farhat, members administer Dr Antoine chartouni, Dr Elia Francis Safi TRAINING and Formation

=== Norway ===
Norway is recognized as an important country for music therapy research. Its two major research centers are the Center for Music and Health with the Norwegian Academy of Music in Oslo, and the Grieg Academy Centre for Music Therapy (GAMUT), at University of Bergen. The former was mostly developed by professor Even Ruud, while professor Brynjulf Stige is largely responsible for cultivating the latter. The center in Bergen has 18 staff, including 2 professors and 4 associate professors, as well as lecturers and PhD students. Two of the field's major international research journals are based in Bergen: Nordic Journal for Music Therapy and Voices: A World Forum for Music Therapy. Norway's main contribution to the field is mostly in the area of "community music therapy", which tends to be as much oriented toward social work as individual psychotherapy, and music therapy research from this country uses a wide variety of methods to examine diverse methods across an array of social contexts, including community centers, medical clinics, retirement homes, and prisons.

=== Nigeria ===
The origins of Musical therapy practices in Nigeria is unknown, however the country is identified to have a lengthy lineage and history of musical therapy being utilized throughout the culture. The most common people associated with music therapy are herbalists, Witch doctors, and faith healers according to Professor Charles O. Aluede of Ambrose Alli University (Ekpoma, Edo State, Nigeria). Applying music and thematic sounds to the healing process is believed to help the patient overcome true sickness in his/her mind which then will seemingly cure the disease. Another practice involving music is called "Igbeuku", a religious practice performed by faith healers. In the practice of Igbeuku, patients are persuaded to confess their sins which cause themselves serve discomfort. Following a confession, patients feel emotionally relieved because the priest has announced them clean and subjected them to a rigorous dancing exercise. The dancing exercise is a "thank you" for the healing and tribute to the spiritual greater beings. The dance is accompanied by music and can be included among the unorthodox medical practices of Nigerian culture. While most of the music therapy practices come in the medical field, musical therapy is often used in the passing of a loved one. The use of song and dance in a funeral setting is very common across the continent but especially in Nigeria. Songs allude to the idea the finally resting place is Hades (hell). The music helps alleviate the sorrows felt by the family members and friends of the lost loved one. Along with music therapy being a practice for funeral events, it is also implemented to those dying as a last resort tactic of healing. The Esan of Edo State of Nigeria, in particular, herbalists perform practices with an Oko – a small aerophone made of elephant tusk which is blown into dying patients' ears to resuscitate them. Nigeria is full of interesting cultural practices in which contribute a lot to the music therapy world.

=== South Africa ===
There are longstanding traditions of music healing, which in some ways may be very different than music therapy.

Mercédès Pavlicevic (1955–2018), an international music therapist, along with Kobie Temmingh, pioneered the music therapy program at the University of Pretoria, which debuted with a master's degree program in 1999. She noted the differences in longstanding traditions and other ways of viewing healing or music. A Nigerian colleague felt "that music in Africa is healing, and what is music therapy other than some colonial import?" Pavlicevic noted that "in Africa there is a long tradition of music healing" and asked "Can there be a synthesis of these two music-based practices towards something new?... I am not altogether convinced that African music healing and music therapy are especially closely related [emphasis added]. But I am utterly convinced that music therapy can learn an enormous amount from the African worldview and from music-making in Africa – rather than from African music-healing as such."

The South African Music Therapy Association can provide information to the public about music therapy or educational programs in South Africa.

South Africa was selected to host the 16th World Congress of Music Therapy in July 2020, a triennial World Federation of Music Therapy event. Due to the coronavirus pandemic (SARS-CoV-2) the congress was moved to an online event.

=== United States ===
==== History ====
From a western viewpoint, music therapy in the 20th and 21st centuries (as of 2021), as an evidence-based, allied healthcare profession, grew out of the aftermath of World Wars I and II, when, particularly in the United Kingdom and United States, musicians would travel to hospitals and play music for soldiers suffering from with war-related emotional and physical trauma. Using music to treat the mental and physical ailments of active duty military and veterans was not new. Its use was recorded during the U.S. Civil War and Florence Nightingale used it a decade earlier in the Crimean War. Despite research data, observations by doctors and nurses, praise from patients, and willing musicians, it was difficult to vastly increase music therapy services or establish lasting music therapy education programs or organizations in the early 20th century. However, many of the music therapy leaders of this time period provided music therapy during WWI or to its veterans. These were pioneers in the field such as Eva Vescelius, musician, author, 1903 founder of the short-lived National Therapeutic Society of New York and the 1913 Music and Health journal, and creator/teacher of a musicotherapy course; Margaret Anderton, pianist, WWI music therapy provider for Canadian soldiers, a strong believer in training for music therapists, and 1919 Columbia University musicotherapy teacher; Isa Maud Ilsen, a nurse and musician who was the American Red Cross Director of Hospital Music in WWI reconstruction hospitals, 1919 Columbia University musicotherapy teacher, 1926 founder of the National Association for Music in Hospitals, and author; and Harriet Ayer Seymour, music therapist to WWI veterans, author, researcher, lecturer/teacher, founder of the National Foundation for Music Therapy in 1941, author of the first music therapy textbook published in the US. Several physicians also promoted music as a therapeutic agent during this time period.

In the 1940s, changes in philosophy regarding care of psychiatric patients as well as the influx of WWII veterans in Veterans Administration hospitals renewed interest in music programs for patients. Many musicians volunteered to provide entertainment and were primarily assigned to perform on psychiatric wards. Positive changes in patients' mental and physical health were noted by nurses. The volunteer musicians, many of whom had degrees in music education, becoming aware of the powerful effects music could have on patients realized that specialized training was necessary. The first music therapy bachelor's degree program was established in 1944 with three others and one master's degree program quickly following: "Michigan State College [now a University] (1944), the University of Kansas [master's degree only] (1946), the College of the Pacific (1947), The Chicago Musical College (1948) and Alverno College (1948)." The National Association for Music Therapy (NAMT), a professional association, was formed in 1950. In 1956, the first music therapy credential in the US, Registered Music Therapist (RMT), was instituted by the NAMT.

The American Music Therapy Association (AMTA) was founded in 1998 as a merger between the National Association for Music Therapy (NAMT, founded in 1950) and the American Association for Music Therapy (AAMT, founded in 1971).

==== Required credentials for licenses ====
The states of Georgia, Illinois, Iowa, Maryland, North Dakota, Nevada, Oklahoma, Oregon, Rhode Island, and Virginia have established licenses for music therapists, while in Wisconsin, music therapists must be registered, and in Utah hold state certification. In the State of New York, the Creative Arts Therapy license (LCAT) incorporates the music therapy credential within their licensure, a mental health license that requires a master's degree and post-graduate supervision. The states of California and Connecticut have title protection for music therapists, meaning only those with the MT-BC credential can use the title "Board Certified Music Therapist".

Publication on music therapy education and training has been detailed in both single author (Goodman, 2011) and edited (Goodman, 2015, 2023) volumes. The register of the European Music Therapy Confederation lists all educational training programs throughout Europe.

A music therapy degree candidate can earn an undergraduate, master's or doctoral degree in music therapy. Many AMTA approved programs in the United States offer equivalency and certificate degrees in music therapy for students that have completed a degree in a related field. Some practicing music therapists have held PhDs either in music therapy or in fields related to music therapy. A music therapist typically incorporates music therapy techniques with broader clinical practices such as psychotherapy, rehabilitation, and other practices depending on client needs. Music therapy services rendered within the context of a social service, educational, or health care agency are often reimbursable by insurance or other sources of funding for individuals with certain needs.

A degree in music therapy requires proficiency in guitar, piano, voice, music theory, music history, reading music, improvisation, as well as varying levels of skill in assessment, documentation, and other counseling and health care skills depending on the focus of the particular university's program. 1200 hours of clinical experience are required, some of which are gained during an approximately six-month internship that takes place after all other degree requirements are met.

After successful completion of educational requirements, including internship, music therapists can apply to take, take, and pass the Board Certification Examination in Music Therapy.

The current national credential is MT-BC (Music Therapist-Board Certified). It is not required in all states. To be eligible to apply to take the Board Certification Examination in Music Therapy, an individual must successfully complete a music therapy degree from a program accredited by AMTA at a college or university (or have a bachelor's degree and complete all of the music therapy course requirements from an accredited program), which includes successfully completing a music therapy internship. To maintain the credential, 100 units of continuing education must be completed every five years. The board exam is created by and administered through The Certification Board for Music Therapists.

=== United Kingdom ===
Live music was used in hospitals after both World Wars as part of the treatment program for recovering soldiers. Clinical music therapy in Britain as it is understood today was pioneered in the 1960s and 1970s by French cellist Juliette Alvin whose influence on the current generation of British music therapy lecturers remains strong. Mary Priestley, one of Juliette Alvin's students, created "analytical music therapy". The Nordoff-Robbins approach to music therapy developed from the work of Paul Nordoff and Clive Robbins in the 1950/60s.

Practitioners are registered with the Health Professions Council and, starting from 2007, new registrants must normally hold a master's degree in music therapy. There are master's level programs in music therapy in Manchester, Bristol, Cambridge, South Wales, Edinburgh and London, and there are therapists throughout the UK. The professional body in the UK is the British Association for Music Therapy. In 2002, the World Congress of Music Therapy, coordinated and promoted by the World Federation of Music Therapy, was held in Oxford on the theme of Dialogue and Debate. In November 2006, Dr. Michael J. Crawford and his colleagues again found that music therapy helped the outcomes of schizophrenic patients.

=== USSR ===
The beneficial effects of music on people are mentioned in the works of several doctors and scientists who lived in the Russian Empire in the late 19th and early 20th centuries (academician I. M. Sechenov, physiologist I. R. Tarkhanov, psychiatrist I. S. Konstorum and others). In the USSR, the "Adjaria" sanatorium was built on the Black Sea coast near the city of Batumi, where listening to birdsong recorded on vinyl records was an element of treatment for patients with insomnia and nervous disorders. In 1959, it was observed that during dental treatment, patients behave more calmly if the noise of the dental drill is drowned out by other sounds. In 1966, dentists at the S. M. Kirov Military Medical Academy developed the first prototype of the ZVAN device - it was a multi-channel stereo tape recorder that had the most effective soothing sound set (it was the sound of a waterfall and several melodies). By 1973, several ZVAN devices had been produced, which were used in the S. M. Kirov Military Medical Academy and several dental clinics in Leningrad.

== Military ==
=== History ===
Music therapy finds its roots in the military. The United States Department of War issued Technical Bulletin 187 in 1945, which described the use of music in the recovery of military service members in Army hospitals. The use of music therapy in military settings started to flourish and develop following World War II and research and endorsements from both the United States Army and the Surgeon General of the United States. Although these endorsements helped music therapy develop, there was still a recognized need to assess the true viability and value of music as a medically based therapy. Walter Reed Army Medical Center and the Office of the Surgeon General worked together to lead one of the earliest assessments of a music therapy program. The goal of the study was to understand whether "music presented according to a specific plan" influenced recovery among service members with mental and emotional disorders. Eventually, case reports in reference to this study relayed not only the importance but also the impact of music therapy services in the recovery of military service personnel.

The first university sponsored music therapy course was taught by Margaret Anderton in 1919 at Columbia University. Anderton's clinical specialty was working with wounded Canadian soldiers during World War II, using music-based services to aid in their recovery process.

Today, Operation Enduring Freedom and Operation Iraqi Freedom have both presented an array of injuries; however, the two signature injuries are post-traumatic stress disorder (PTSD) and traumatic brain injury (TBI). These two signature injuries are increasingly common among millennial military service members and in music therapy programs.

A person diagnosed with PTSD can associate a memory or experience with a song they have heard. This can result in either good or bad experiences. If it is a bad experience, the song's rhythm or lyrics can bring out the person's anxiety or fear response. If it is a good experience, the song can bring feelings of happiness or peace which could bring back positive emotions. Either way, music can be used as a tool to bring emotions forward and help the person cope with them.

=== Methods ===
Music therapists work with active duty military personnel, veterans, service members in transition, and their families. Music therapists strive to engage clients in music experiences that foster trust and complete participation over the course of their treatment process. Music therapists use an array of music-centered tools, techniques, and activities when working with military-associated clients, many of which are similar to the techniques used in other music therapy settings. These methods include, but are not limited to: group drumming, listening, singing, and songwriting. Songwriting is a particularly effective tool with military veterans struggling with PTSD and TBI as it creates a safe space to, "... work through traumatic experiences, and transform traumatic memories into healthier associations".

=== Programs ===
Music therapy in the military is seen in programs on military bases, VA healthcare facilities, military treatment facilities, and military communities. Music therapy programs have a large outreach because they exist for all phases of military life: pre-mobilization, deployment, post-deployment, recovery (in the case of injury), and among families of fallen military service personnel.

The Exceptional Family Member Program (EFMP) also exists to provide music therapy services to active duty military families who have a family member with a developmental, physical, emotional, or intellectual disorder. Currently, programs at the Davis–Monthan Air Force Base, Resounding Joy, Inc., and the Music Institute of Chicago partner with EFMP services to provide music therapy services to eligible military family members.

Music therapy programs primarily target active duty military members and their treatment facility to provide reconditioning among members convalescing in Army hospitals. Although, music therapy programs not only benefit the military but rather a wide range of clients including the U.S. Air Force, American Navy, and U.S. Marines Corp. Individuals exposed to trauma benefit from their essential rehabilitative tools to follow the course of recovery from stress disorders. Music therapists are certified professionals who possess the abilities to determine appropriate interventions to support one recovering from a physically, emotionally, or mentally traumatic experience. In addition to their skills, they play an integral part throughout the treatment process of service members diagnosed with post-traumatic stress or brain injuries. In many cases, self-expression through songwriting or using instruments help restore emotions that can be lost following trauma. Music has a significant effect on troops traveling overseas or between bases because many soldiers view music to be an escape from war, a connection to their homeland and families, or as motivation. By working with a certified music therapist, marines undergo sessions re-instituting concepts of cognition, memory attention, and emotional processing. Although programs primarily focus on phases of military life, other service members such as the U.S. Air Force are eligible for treatment as well. For instance, during a music therapy session, a man begins to play a song to a wounded Airmen. The Airmen says "[music] allows me to talk about something that happened without talking about it". Music allows the active duty airmen to open up about previous experiences while reducing his anxiety level.

== History ==
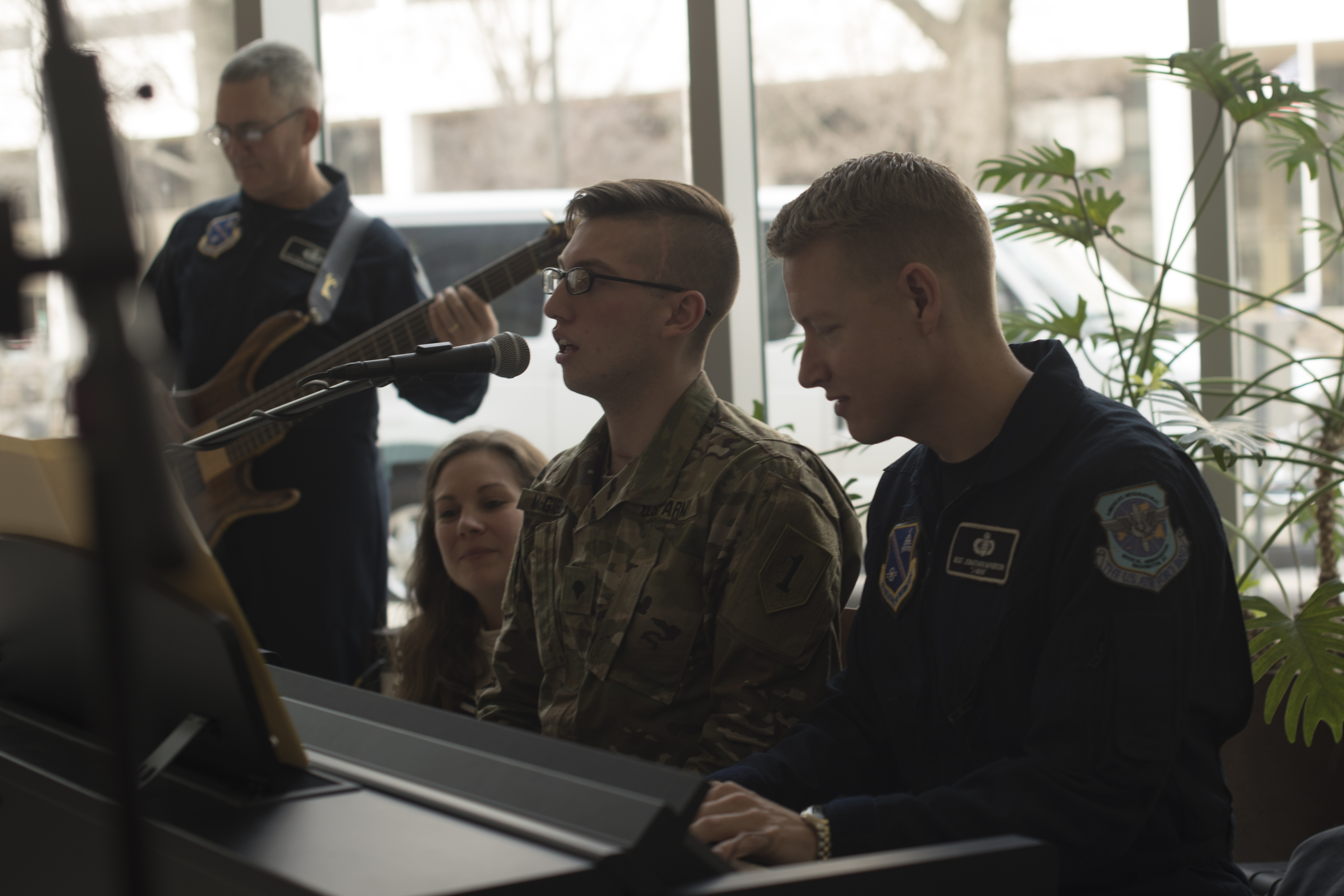
A Military personnel practicing music therapy, with a Music Therapist.

The use of music to soothe grief has been used since the time of David and King Saul. In I Samuel, David plays the lyre to make King Saul feel relieved and better. It has since been used all over the world for treatment of various issues, though the first recorded use of official "music therapy" was in 1789 – an article titled "Music Physically Considered" by an unknown author was found in Columbian Magazine. The creation and expansion of music therapy as a treatment modality thrived in the early to mid 1900s and while a number of organizations were created, none survived for long. It was not until 1950 that the National Association for Music Therapy was founded in New York that clinical training and certification requirements were created. In 1971, the American Association for Music Therapy was created, though at that time called the Urban Federation of Music Therapists. The Certification Board for Music Therapists was created in 1983 which strengthened the practice of music therapy and the trust that it was given. In 1998, the American Music Therapy Association was formed out of a merger between National and American Associations and as of 2017 is the single largest music therapy organization in the world (American music therapy, 1998–2025).

Ancient flutes, carved from ivory and bone, were found by archaeologists, that were determined to be from as far back as 43,000 years ago. He also states that "The earliest fragment of musical notation is found on a 4,000-year-old Sumerian clay tablet, which includes instructions and tuning for a hymn honoring the ruler Lipit-Ishtar. But for the title of oldest extant song, most historians point to "Hurrian Hymn No. 6," an ode to the goddess Nikkal that was composed in cuneiform by the ancient Hurrian's sometime around the 14th century B.C.".

Apollo is the ancient Greek god of music and of medicine and his son Aesculapius was said to cure diseases of the mind by using song and music. By 5000 BC, music was used for healing by Egyptian priest-physicians. Plato said that music affected the emotions and could influence the character of an individual. Aristotle taught that music affects the soul and described music as a force that purified the emotions. Aulus Cornelius Celsus advocated the sound of cymbals and running water for the treatment of mental disorders. Music as therapy was practiced in the Bible when David played the harp to rid King Saul of a bad spirit (1 Sam 16:23). As early as 400 B.C., Hippocrates played music for mental patients. In the 13th century, Arab hospitals contained music-rooms for the benefit of the patients. In the United States, Native American medicine men often employed chants and dances as a method of healing patients. The Turco-Persian psychologist and music theorist al-Farabi (872–950), known as Alpharabius in Europe, dealt with music for healing in his treatise Meanings of the Intellect, in which he discussed the therapeutic effects of music on the soul. In his De vita libri tres published in 1489, Platonist Marsilio Ficino gives a lengthy account of how music and songs can be used to draw celestial benefits for staying healthy. Robert Burton wrote in the 17th century in his classic work, The Anatomy of Melancholy, that music and dance were critical in treating mental illness, especially melancholia.

The rise of an understanding of the body and mind in terms of the nervous system led to the emergence of a new wave of music for healing in the 18th century. Earlier works on the subject, such as Athanasius Kircher's Musurgia Universalis of 1650 and even early 18th-century books such as Michael Ernst Ettmüller's 1714 Disputatio effectus musicae in hominem (Disputation on the Effect of Music on Man) or Friedrich Erhardt Niedten's 1717 Veritophili, still tended to discuss the medical effects of music in terms of bringing the soul and body into harmony. But from the mid-18th century works on the subject such as Richard Brocklesby's 1749 Reflections of Antient and Modern Musick, the 1737 Memoires of the French Academy of Sciences, or Ernst Anton Nicolai's 1745 Die Verbindung der Musik mit der Arzneygelahrheit (The Connection of Music to Medicine), stressed the power of music over the nerves.

After 1800, some books on music and medicine drew on the Brunonian system of medicine, arguing that the stimulation of the nerves caused by music could directly improve or harm health. Throughout the 19th century, an impressive number of books and articles were authored by physicians in Europe and the United States discussing use of music as a therapeutic agent to treat both mental and physical illness.

From a western viewpoint, music therapy in the 20th and 21st centuries (as of 2021), as an evidence-based, allied healthcare profession, grew out of the aftermath of World Wars I and II. Particularly in the United Kingdom and United States, musicians would travel to hospitals and play music for soldiers with war-related emotional and physical trauma. Using music to treat the mental and physical ailments of active duty military and veterans was not new. Its use was recorded during the US Civil War and Florence Nightingale used it a decade earlier in the Crimean War. Despite research data, observations by doctors and nurses, praise from patients, and willing musicians, it was difficult to vastly increase music therapy services or establish lasting music therapy education programs or organizations in the early 20th century. However, many of the music therapy leaders of this time period provided music therapy during WWI or to its veterans. These were pioneers in the field such as Eva Vescelius, musician, author, 1903 founder of the short-lived National Therapeutic Society of New York and the 1913 Music and Health journal, and creator/teacher of a musicotherapy course; Margaret Anderton, pianist, World War I music therapy provider for Canadian soldiers, a strong believer in training for music therapists, and 1919 Columbia University musicotherapy teacher; Isa Maud Ilsen, a nurse and musician who was the American Red Cross Director of Hospital Music in World War I reconstruction hospitals, 1919 Columbia University musicotherapy teacher, 1926 founder of the National Association for Music in Hospitals, and author; and Harriet Ayer Seymour, music therapist to World War I veterans, author, researcher, lecturer/teacher, founder of the National Foundation for Music Therapy in 1941, author of the first music therapy textbook published in the United States. Several physicians also promoted music as a therapeutic agent during this time period.

In the United States, the first music therapy bachelor's degree program was established in 1944 at Michigan State College (now Michigan State University).

== See also ==
- Affective neuroscience
- Art therapy
- Biomusicology
- Chronobiology
- Dispokinesis
- Eloise (psychiatric hospital)
- Embodied music cognition
- Expressive therapies
- Melodic intonation therapy
- Music and sleep
- Music as a coping strategy
- Musical analysis
- Music cognition
- Music psychology
- Psychoacoustics
- Psychoanalysis and music
- Psychoneuroimmunology

== Bibliography ==
- American Psychiatric Association (2000). Diagnostic and statistical manual of mental disorders (4th edn, revised). Washington, D.C.: Author.
- Gibson, David (2018). The Complete Guide to Sound Healing (2nd edn), Sound of Light.
- Goodman, K. D. (2011), Music therapy education and training: From theory to practice. Charles C. Thomas.
- Goodman, K. D. (ed.) (2015), International perspectives in music therapy education and training. Charles C Thomas.
- Goodman, K. D. (ed.) (2023), Developing issues in world music therapy education and training: A plurality of views. Charles C Thomas.
- Hilliard, R. E. (2001). "The effects of music therapy-based bereavement groups on mood and behavior of grieving children: A pilot study". Journal of Music Therapy, 38(4), 291–306.
- Hilliard, R. E. (2007). "The effects of orff-based music therapy and social work groups on childhood grief symptoms and behaviors". Journal of Music Therapy, 44(2), 123–38.
- Jones, J. D. (2005). "A comparison of songwriting and lyric analysis techniques to evoke emotional change in a single session with people who are chemically dependent", Journal of Music Therapy, 42, 94–110.
- Krout, R. E. (2005). "Applications of music therapist-composed songs in creating participant connections and facilitating goals and rituals during one-time bereavement support groups and programs". Music Therapy Perspectives, 23(2), 118–128.
- Lindenfelser, K. J., Grocke, D., & McFerran, K. (2008). "Bereaved parents' experiences of music therapy with their terminally ill child". Journal of Music Therapy, 45(3), 330–48.
- Rosner, R., Kruse, J., & Hagl, M. (2010). "A meta‐analysis of interventions for bereaved children and adolescents". Death Studies, 34(2), 99–136.
- Schwantes, M., Wigram, T., McKinney, C., Lipscomb, A., & Richards, C. (2011). "The Mexican corrido and its use in a music therapy bereavement group". The Australian Journal of Music Therapy, 22, 2–20.
- Silverman, M. J. (2008). "Quantitative comparison of cognitive behavioral therapy and music therapy research: A methodological best-practices analysis to guide future investigation for adult psychiatric patients". Journal of Music Therapy, 45(4), 457–506.
- Silverman, M. J. (2009). "The use of lyric analysis interventions in contemporary psychiatric music therapy: Descriptive results of songs and objectives for clinical practice". Music Therapy Perspectives, 27(1), 55–61.
- Silverman, M. J., & Marcionetti, M. J. (2004). "Immediate effects of a single music therapy intervention on persons who are severely mentally ill". Arts in Psychotherapy, 31, 291–301.
- Valentino, R. E. (2006). Attitudes towards cross-cultural empathy in music therapy. Music Therapy Perspectives, 24(2), 108–114.
- Whitehead-Pleaux, A. M., Baryza, M. J., & Sheridan, R. L. (2007). "Exploring the effects of music therapy on pediatric pain: phase 1". The Journal of Music Therapy, 44(3), 217–41.
