= S.P.I.T. (music) =

Musical improvisation methodology

S.P.I.T. or sometimes simply called SPIT is a methodology developed by Mark and Jane Shellhammer, is a specific way of learning musical improvisation. The letters S.P.I.T. is an acronym for scale, pattern, inversion, and triad and usually pertains to the first four chord types which include major 7, dominant 7, minor 7, and half-diminished expressed in all twelve key signatures. The use of S.P.I.T. methodology involves matching the scale, pattern, inversion, and triad to the key signature of the song that requires improvisation. The methodology allows the musician to scan the S.P.I.T. page that matches the key signature of the song for improvisational embellishments that can be applied during rests or whole notes in the melody.
