= Daphne Rickson =

New Zealand music therapist

Daphne Rickson ONZM
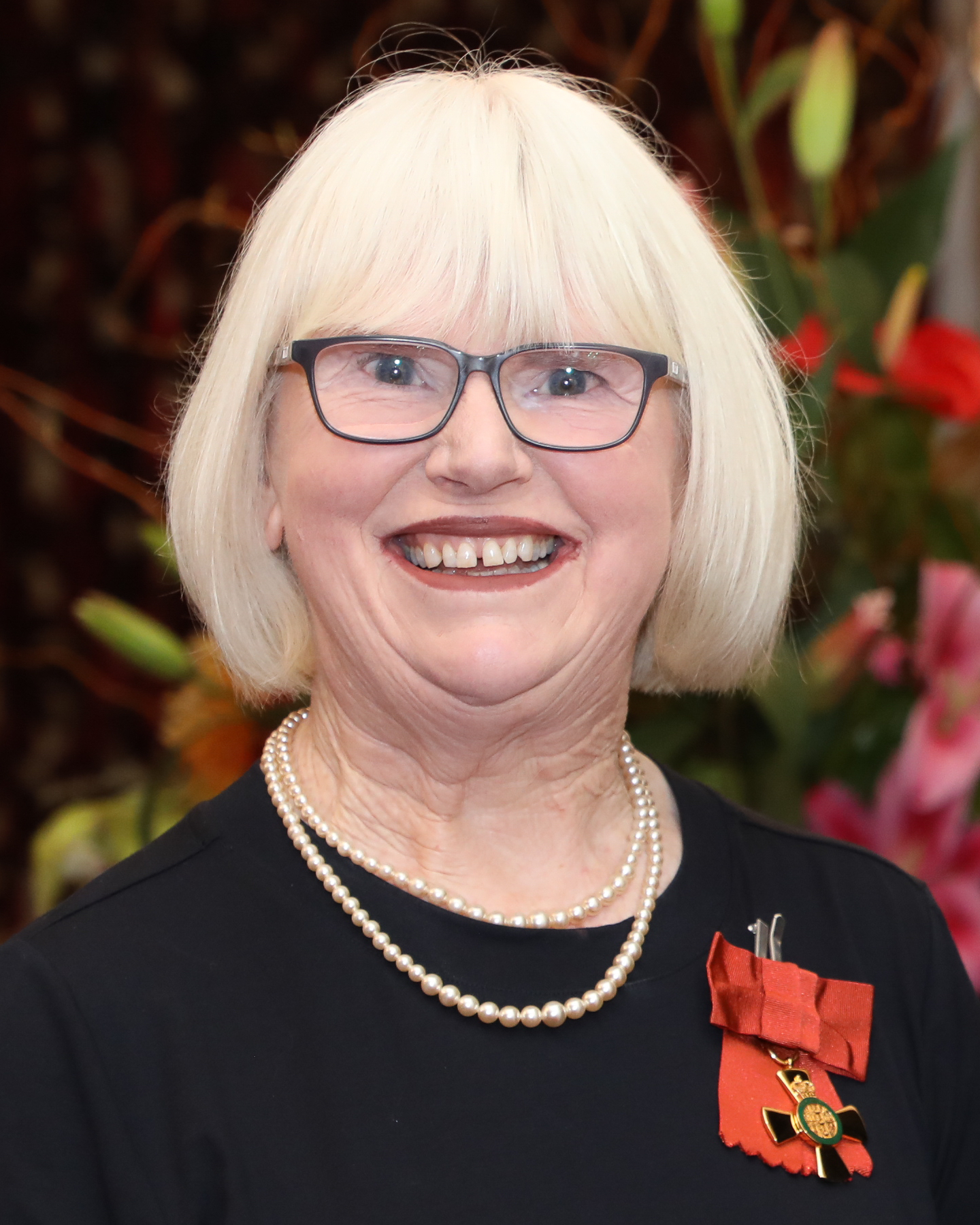
- Awards: Officer of the New Zealand Order of Merit

Academic background
- Education: Massey University, New Zealand School of Music
- Theses: Instructional and improvisational models of music therapy with adolescents who have attention deficit hyperactivity disorder (ADHD): a comparison of the effects on motor impulsivity (2004); The development of a music therapy school consultation protocol for students with high or very high special education needs (2010)
- Doctoral advisor: Leslie Bunt, Jill Bevan-Brown, Donald Maurice

Daphne Joan Rickson ONZM is a New Zealand music therapist and academic, and until 2021 was a lecturer at the New Zealand School of Music. She has contributed to the field of music therapy nationally and internationally. In 2022 she was appointed an Officer of the New Zealand Order of Merit for services to music therapy. In 2023 Rickson received the World Federation of Music Therapy Lifetime Achievement Award.

== Academic career ==
Rickson was born in Ashburton in Canterbury, New Zealand. She earned an LCTL in pianoforte and theory, and then completed a Master's degree in mental health at the University of Otago. Rickson notes that when she qualified and began working as a music therapist in the 1990s, there were "only a handful of us in the country". Rickson went on to complete a Master's degree in music therapy at Massey University in 2004 and then a PhD titled The development of a music therapy school consultation protocol for students with high or very high special education needs at the New Zealand School of Music (NZSM). Her PhD, completed in 2010, was the first doctoral degree in music therapy in New Zealand.

Rickson joined the faculty of the NZSM. She helped develop a master's programme for music therapy, which began in 2003. Rickson retired from the New Zealand School of Music in 2021, having taught over 100 postgraduate students, and retains adjunct professor status.

Rickson served on the national council of Music Therapy New Zealand, and from 1997 to 2002 was chair, and from 2008 until 2012 was president. She is President Emeritus and a life member of Music Therapy New Zealand. She is the Australasian Regional Liaison for the World Federation of Music Therapy Council.

Rickson's research focuses on people with complex needs, and how to use music to enable greater community participation for marginalised children and adults. She investigated how singing could be used to enhance well-being in Christchurch after the earthquakes. She has written more than forty publications and co-authored a book on community music therapy through schools, as well as publishing a history of music therapy in New Zealand.

== Honours and awards ==
In the 2022 Queen's Birthday Honours she was appointed an Officer of the New Zealand Order of Merit for services to music therapy. In 2023 Rickson received the World Federation of Music Therapy Lifetime Achievement Award.

== Selected works ==
- Rickson, Daphne; Skewes McFerran, Katrina (2014). Creating Music Cultures in the Schools: A Perspective from Community Music Therapy. Dallas, Texas: Barcelona Publishers. p. 162. ISBN 9781937440619.
- Rickson, Daphne (13 September 2024). A History of Music Therapy New Zealand (1974-2023): Passionate People [Te Hītori o “Te Rōpū Puoro Whakaora o Aotearoa” (1974-2023): Te Hunga Ngākau Whiwhita]. Barcelona Publishers. p. 209. ISBN 978-1945411823.
- Rickson, Daphne Joan; William G Watkins (2003). "Music therapy to promote prosocial behaviors in aggressive adolescent boys--a pilot study". Journal of Music Therapy. 40 (4): 283–301. doi:10.1093/jmt/40.4.283. PMID 15015908. Wikidata Q30340859.
- Rickson, Daphne Joan (2006). "Instructional and improvisational models of music therapy with adolescents who have attention deficit hyperactivity disorder (ADHD): a comparison of the effects on motor impulsivity". Journal of Music Therapy. 43 (1): 39–62. doi:10.1093/jmt/43.1.39. PMID 16671837. Wikidata Q30354176.
- Jun Jiang; Rickson, Daphne Joan; Cunmei Jiang (2016). "The mechanism of music for reducing psychological stress: Music preference as a mediator". Arts in Psychotherapy. 48: 62–68. doi:10.1016/j.aip.2016.02.002. Wikidata Q131566743.
- Jun Jiang; Linshu Zhou; Rickson, Daphne Joan; Cunmei Jiang (2013). "The effects of sedative and stimulative music on stress reduction depend on music preference". Arts in Psychotherapy. 40 (2): 201–205. doi:10.1016/j.aip.2013.02.002. Wikidata Q131566753.
- McFerran, Katrina; Rickson, Daphne Joan (2014). "Community music therapy in schools: Realigning with the needs of contemporary students, staff and systems". International Journal of Community Music. 7 (1): 75–92. doi:10.1386/ijcm.7.1.75_1. Wikidata Q131566741.
