= Musical improvisation =

Spontaneous musical composition or performance

Zye - "It's hard not to be an alien."
Piano improvisation piece

Musical improvisation (also known as musical extemporization) is the creative activity of immediate ("in the moment") musical composition, which combines performance with communication of emotions and instrumental technique as well as spontaneous response to other musicians. Sometimes musical ideas in improvisation are spontaneous, but may be based on chord changes in classical music and many other kinds of music. One definition is a "performance given extempore without planning or preparation". Another definition is to "play or sing (music) extemporaneously, by inventing variations on a melody or creating new melodies, rhythms and harmonies". Encyclopædia Britannica defines it as "the extemporaneous composition or free performance of a musical passage, usually in a manner conforming to certain stylistic norms but unfettered by the prescriptive features of a specific musical text." Improvisation is often done within (or based on) a pre-existing harmonic framework or chord progression. Improvisation is a major part of some types of 20th-century music, such as blues, rock music, jazz, and jazz fusion, in which instrumental performers improvise solos, melody lines and accompaniment parts.

Throughout the eras of the Western art music tradition, including the Medieval, Renaissance, Baroque, Classical, and Romantic periods, improvisation was a valued skill. J. S. Bach, Handel, Mozart, Beethoven, Chopin, Liszt, and many other famous composers and musicians were known especially for their improvisational skills. Improvisation might have played an important role in the monophonic period. The earliest treatises on polyphony, such as the Musica enchiriadis (ninth century), indicate that added parts were improvised for centuries before the first notated examples. However, it was only in the fifteenth century that theorists began making a hard distinction between improvised and written music.

Some classical music forms contained sections for improvisation, such as the cadenza in solo concertos, or the preludes to some keyboard suites by Bach and Handel, which consist of elaborations of a progression of chords, which performers are to use as the basis for their improvisation. Handel and Bach frequently improvised on the harpsichord or pipe organ. In the Baroque era, performers improvised ornaments, and basso continuo keyboard players improvised chord voicings based on figured bass notation. However, in the 20th and early 21st century, as common practice Western art music performance became institutionalized in symphony orchestras, opera houses and ballets, improvisation has played a smaller role. At the same time, some contemporary composers from the 20th and 21st century have increasingly included improvisation in their creative work.

In Indian classical music, improvisation is a core component and an essential criterion of performances. In Indian, Afghan, Pakistani, and Bangladeshi classical music, raga is the "tonal framework for composition and improvisation". The Britannica defines a raga as "a melodic framework for improvisation and composition".

== In Western music ==
=== Medieval period ===
Although melodic improvisation was an important factor in European music from the earliest times, the first detailed information on improvisation technique appears in ninth-century treatises instructing singers on how to add another melody to a pre-existent liturgical chant, in a style called organum. Throughout the Middle Ages and Renaissance, improvised counterpoint over a cantus firmus (a practice found both in church music and in popular dance music) constituted a part of every musician's education, and is regarded as the most important kind of unwritten music before the Baroque period.

=== Renaissance period ===
Following the invention of music printing at the beginning of the sixteenth century, there is more detailed documentation of improvisational practice, in the form of published instruction manuals, mainly in Italy. In addition to improvising counterpoint over a cantus firmus, singers and instrumentalists improvised melodies over ostinato chord patterns, made elaborate embellishments of melodic lines, and invented music extemporaneously without any predetermined schemata. Keyboard players likewise performed extempore, freely formed pieces.

=== Baroque period ===
The kinds of improvisation practised during the Renaissance—principally either the embellishing of an existing part or the creation of an entirely new part or parts—continued into the early Baroque, though important modifications were introduced. Ornamentation began to be brought more under the control of composers, in some cases by writing out embellishments, and more broadly by introducing symbols or abbreviations for certain ornamental patterns. Two of the earliest important sources for vocal ornamentation of this sort are Giovanni Battista Bovicelli's Regole, passaggi di musica (1594), and the preface to Giulio Caccini's collection, Le nuove musiche (1601/2)

==== Melodic instruments ====
Eighteenth-century manuals make it clear that performers on the flute, oboe, violin, and other melodic instruments were expected not only to ornament previously composed pieces, but also spontaneously to improvise preludes.

==== Basso continuo ====
The basso continuo (accompaniment) was mainly improvised, the composer usually providing no more than a harmonic sketch called the figured bass. The process of improvisation was called realization.

==== Organ improvisation and church music ====
see Category:Organ improvisers

According to Encyclopædia Britannica, the "monodic textures that originated about 1600 ... were ready-made, indeed in large measure intended, for improvisational enhancement, not only of the treble parts but also, almost by definition, of the bass, which was figured to suggest no more than a minimal chordal outline." Improvised accompaniment over a figured bass was a common practice during the Baroque era, and to some extent the following periods. Improvisation remains a feature of organ playing in some church services and are regularly also performed at concerts.

Dieterich Buxtehude and Johann Sebastian Bach were regarded in the Baroque period as highly skilled organ improvisers. During the 20th century, some musicians known as great improvisers such as Marcel Dupré, Pierre Cochereau and Pierre Pincemaille continued this form of music, in the tradition of the French organ school. Maurice Duruflé, a great improviser himself, transcribed improvisations by Louis Vierne and Charles Tournemire. Olivier Latry later wrote his improvisations as compositions, for example Salve Regina.

=== Classical period ===
==== Keyboard improvisation ====
Classical music departs from baroque style in that sometimes several voices may move together as chords involving both hands, to form brief phrases without any passing tones. Though such motifs were used sparingly by Mozart, they were taken up much more liberally by Beethoven and Schubert. Such chords also appeared to some extent in baroque keyboard music, such as the 3rd movement theme in Bach's Italian Concerto. But at that time such a chord often appeared only in one clef at a time, (or one hand on the keyboard) and did not form the independent phrases found more in later music. Adorno mentions this movement of the Italian Concerto as a more flexible, improvisatory form, in comparison to Mozart, suggesting the gradual diminishment of improvisation well before its decline became obvious.

The introductory gesture of tonic, subdominant, dominant, tonic, however, much like its baroque form, continues to appear at the beginning of high-classical and romantic piano pieces (and much other music) as in Haydn's Piano Sonata Hob. XVI/52 and Beethoven's Sonata No. 24, Op. 78.

Beethoven and Mozart cultivated mood markings such as con amore, appassionato, cantabile, and expressivo. In fact, it is perhaps because improvisation is spontaneous that it is akin to the communication of love.

===== Mozart and Beethoven =====
Beethoven and Mozart left excellent examples of what their improvisations were like, in the sets of variations and the sonatas which they published, and in their written out cadenzas (which illustrate what their improvisations would have sounded like). As a keyboard player, Mozart competed at least once in improvisation, with Muzio Clementi. Beethoven won many tough improvisatory battles over such rivals as Johann Nepomuk Hummel, Daniel Steibelt, and Joseph Woelfl.

=== Romantic period ===
==== Instrumental ====
Extemporization, both in the form of introductions to pieces, and links between pieces, continued to be a feature of keyboard concertising until the early 20th-century. Amongst those who practised such improvisation were Franz Liszt, Felix Mendelssohn, Anton Rubinstein, Paderewski, Percy Grainger and Pachmann. Improvisation in the area of art music seems to have declined with the growth of recording.

==== Opera ====
After studying over 1,200 early Verdi recordings, Will Crutchfield concludes that "The solo cavatina was the most obvious and enduring locus of soloistic discretion in nineteenth-century opera." He goes on to identify seven main types of vocal improvisation used by opera singers in this repertory:

1. The Verdian "full-stop" cadenza
2. Arias without "full-stop": ballate, canzoni, and romanze
3. Ornamentation of internal cadences
4. Melodic variants (interpolated high notes, acciaccature, rising two-note "slide")
5. Strophic variation and the problem of the cabaletta
6. Facilitations (puntature, simplification of fioratura, etc.)
7. Recitative

== Contemporary ==
=== Jazz ===
Improvisation is one of the basic elements that sets jazz apart from other types of music. The unifying moments in improvisation that take place in live performance are understood to encompass the performer, the listener, and the physical space that the performance takes place in. Even if improvisation is also found outside of jazz, it may be that no other music relies so much on the art of "composing in the moment", demanding that every musician rise to a certain level of creativity that may put the performer in touch with his or her unconscious as well as conscious states. The educational use of improvised jazz recordings is widely acknowledged. They offer a clear value as documentation of performances despite their perceived limitations. With these available, generations of jazz musicians are able to implicate styles and influences in their performed new improvisations. Many varied scales and their modes can be used in improvisation. They are often not written down in the process, but they help musicians practice the jazz idiom.

A common view of what a jazz soloist does could be expressed thus: as the harmonies go by, he selects notes from each chord, out of which he fashions a melody. He is free to embellish by means of passing and neighbor tones, and he may add extensions to the chords, but at all times a good improviser must follow the changes. ... [However], a jazz musician really has several options: he may reflect the chord progression exactly, he may "skim over" the progression and simply decorate with notes from the key of the piece (parent musical scale), or he may fashion his own voice-leading, using his intuition and listening experience, which may clash at some points with the chords the rhythm section is playing.

=== Folk music ===
Certain folk music traditions, including Irish fiddle music, old-time music, traditional blues and bluegrass music, commonly include improvised sections. In bluegrass, short improvised solos are called "breaks" and they are performed during specific sections of a tune. As an example, in a song, a break might be performed at the end of each chorus, and each break within that song would be performed by a different musician. Certain bluegrass tunes are known as "breakdowns"; those are pieces that are entirely composed of instrumental breaks from start to end, where different musicians take turns improvising.

=== Contemporary classical music ===
With the notable exception of liturgical improvisation on the organ, the first half of the twentieth century is marked by an almost total absence of actual improvisation in contemporary classical music. Since the 1950s, some contemporary composers have placed fewer restrictions on the improvising performer, using techniques such as vague notation (for example, indicating only that a certain number of notes must sound within a defined period of time). New Music ensembles formed around improvisation were founded, such as the Scratch Orchestra in England; Musica Elettronica Viva in Italy; Lukas Foss Improvisation Chamber Ensemble at the University of California, Los Angeles; Larry Austin's New Music Ensemble at the University of California, Davis; the ONCE Group at Ann Arbor; the Sonic Arts Group; and Sonics, the latter three funding themselves through concerts, tours, and grants. Significant pieces include Foss Time Cycles (1960) and Echoi (1963).

Other composers working with improvisation include Richard Barrett, Benjamin Boretz, Pierre Boulez, Joseph Brent, Sylvano Bussotti, Cornelius Cardew, Jani Christou, Douglas J. Cuomo, Alvin Curran, Stuart Dempster, Hugh Davies, Karlheinz Essl, Mohammed Fairouz, Rolf Gehlhaar, Vinko Globokar, Richard Grayson, Hans-Joachim Hespos, Barton McLean, Priscilla McLean, Stephen Nachmanovitch, Pauline Oliveros, Henri Pousseur, Todd Reynolds, Terry Riley, Frederic Rzewski, Saman Samadi, William O. Smith, Manfred Stahnke, Karlheinz Stockhausen, Tōru Takemitsu, Richard Teitelbaum, Vangelis, Michael Vetter, Christian Wolff, Iannis Xenakis, Yitzhak Yedid, La Monte Young, Frank Zappa, Hans Zender, and John Zorn.

=== Psychedelic and progressive rock music ===
British and American psychedelic rock acts of the 1960s and 1970s used improvisations to express themselves in a musical language. The American rock band Grateful Dead based their career around improvised live performances, meaning that no two shows ever sounded the same. Improvisation was a key part of Pink Floyd's music from 1967 to 1972. King Crimson's live performances consisted of many improvisational pieces. The improvisation died down in the 1980s, but saw a resurgence in the 1990s.

Rock bands that perform largely improvised music are also known as jam bands.

=== Silent-film music ===
In the realm of silent film-music performance, there were musicians (theatre organ players and piano players) whose improvised performances accompanying these film has been recognized as exceptional by critics, scholars, and audiences alike. Neil Brand was a composer who also performed improvisationally. Brand, along with Guenter A. Buchwald, Philip Carli, Stephen Horne, Donald Sosin, John Sweeney, and Gabriel Thibaudeau, all performed at the annual conference on silent film in Pordenone, Italy, Le Giornate del Cinema Muto. In improvising for silent film, performers have to play music that matches the mood, style and pacing of the films they accompany. In some cases, musicians had to accompany films at first sight, without preparation. Improvisers needed to know a wide range of musical styles and have the stamina to play for sequences of films which occasionally ran over three hours. In addition to the performances, some pianists also taught master classes for those who wanted to develop their skill in improvising for films. When talkies–motion pictures with sound–were introduced, these talented improvising musicians had to find other jobs. In the 2010s, there are a small number of film societies which present vintage silent films, using live improvising musicians to accompany the film.

=== Musical comedy ===
Improvisational comedians may incorporate music into their work, improvising humorous lyrics to songs. Comedy can be wrought from the surprise and subversion that improvisation allows. The shortform comedy television show Whose Line Is It Anyway? frequently ends episodes with a "Hoedown" in which performers alternate lines, requiring them to complete rhymes set up by their castmates. The musical accompaniment for "Hoedown" is not improvised; by contrast, other games ask the live musicians to follow along with the comedians. Wayne Brady and Josie Lawrence were among the most skilled performers at musical games.

Make Some Noise features "Karaoke Night" episodes with performers selecting fictional song titles attributed to real artists, improvising in an impersonation of that artists' style. They are accompanied live by a pianist, with additional non-improvised instrumentation added in post-production.

Also on Dropout, Play it by Ear features longform improvisation of an entire musical theatre show with a live band. The main cast of Play it by Ear are Jessica McKenna and Zach Reino, who also created Off Book: the Improvised Musical. Originally a podcast, Off Book is a live touring show in which the duo create a new musical based on audience suggestions.

=== Venues ===
Worldwide there are many venues dedicated to supporting live improvisation. In Melbourne since 1998, the Make It Up Club (held every Tuesday evening at Bar Open on Brunswick Street, Melbourne) has been presenting a weekly concert series dedicated to promoting avant-garde improvised music and sound performance of the highest conceptual and performative standards (regardless of idiom, genre, or instrumentation). The Make It Up Club has become an institution in Australian improvised music and consistently features artists from all over the world.

=== Music education ===
A number of approaches to teaching improvisation have emerged in jazz pedagogy, popular music pedagogy, the Dalcroze method, Orff-Schulwerk, and Satis Coleman's creative music. Current research in music education includes investigating how often improvisation is taught, how confident music majors and teachers are at teaching improvisation, neuroscience and psychological aspects of improvisation, and free-improvisation as a pedagogical approach.

== In Indian classical music ==
A raga is one of the melodic modes used in Indian classical music. Joep Bor of the Rotterdam Conservatory of Music has defined Raga as "tonal framework for composition and improvisation". Nazir Jairazbhoy, chairman of UCLA's department of ethnomusicology, characterized ragas as separated by scale, line of ascent and descent, transilience, emphasized notes and register, and intonation and ornaments. A raga uses a series of five or more musical notes upon which a melody is constructed. However, the way the notes are approached and rendered in musical phrases and the mood they convey are more important in defining a raga than the notes themselves. In the Indian musical tradition, rāgas are associated with different times of the day, or with seasons. Indian classical music is always set in a rāga. Non-classical music such as popular Indian film songs and ghazals sometimes use rāgas in their compositions.

According to Encyclopædia Britannica, a raga, also spelled rag (in northern India) or ragam (in southern India), (from Sanskrit, meaning "colour" or "passion"), in the classical music of India, Bangladesh, and Pakistan, is "a melodic framework for improvisation and composition. A raga is based on a scale with a given set of notes, a typical order in which they appear in melodies, and characteristic musical motifs. The basic components of a raga can be written down in the form of a scale (in some cases differing in ascent and descent). By using only these notes, by emphasizing certain degrees of the scale, and by going from note to note in ways characteristic to the raga, the performer sets out to create a mood or atmosphere (rasa) that is unique to the raga in question. There are several hundred ragas in present use, and thousands are possible in theory."

Alapa (Sanskrit: "conversation") are "improvised melody structures that reveal the musical characteristics of a raga". "Alapa ordinarily constitutes the first section of the performance of a raga. Vocal or instrumental, it is accompanied by a drone (sustained-tone) instrument and often also by a melodic instrument that repeats the soloist's phrases after a lag of a few seconds. The principal portion of alapa is not metric but rhythmically free; in Hindustani music it moves gradually to a section known as jor, which uses a rhythmic pulse though no tala (metric cycle). The performer of the alapa gradually introduces the essential notes and melodic turns of the raga to be performed. Only when the soloist is satisfied that he has set forth the full range of melodic possibilities of the raga and has established its unique mood and personality will he proceed, without interruption, to the metrically organized section of the piece. If a drummer is present, as is usual in formal concert, his first beats serve as a signal to the listener that the alapa is concluded."

== Artificial intelligence ==
Machine improvisation uses computer algorithms to create improvisation on existing music materials. This is usually done by sophisticated recombination of musical phrases extracted from existing music, either live or pre-recorded. In order to achieve credible improvisation in particular style, machine improvisation uses machine learning and pattern matching algorithms to analyze existing musical examples. The resulting patterns are then used to create new variations "in the style" of the original music, developing a notion of stylistic reinjection. This is different from other improvisation methods with computers that use algorithmic composition to generate new music without performing analysis of existing music examples.

== See also ==
- Bar-line shift
- Bluegrass music
- Free improvisation
- Improvisation in music therapy
- Impro-Visor (software)
- Jam session
- Jam band
- List of free improvising musicians and groups
- Modular synthesis
- Music for People
- Musical collective
- Musics (magazine)
- Non-lexical vocables in music
- Prepared guitar
- Prepared piano
- Side-slipping
- S.P.I.T

== Notes ==
=== Sources ===
- Abert, Hermann (2007). Cliff Eisen (ed.). W. A. Mozart. Translated by Stewart Spencer. New Haven: Yale University Press. ISBN 978-0-300-07223-5.
- Adorno, Theodor W. (1973). The Jargon of Authenticity. Translated by Knut Tarnowski; Frederic Will. Evanston, Illinois: Northwestern University Press. ISBN 0-8101-0407-5.
- Adorno, Theodor W. (1981). Prisms. Studies in Contemporary German Social Thought. Translated by Samuel Weber; Shierry Weber. Cambridge, Massachusetts: MIT Press. ISBN 0-262-51025-1.
- Adorno, Theodor W. (1997). Aesthetic Theory. Translated by Robert Hullot-Kentor. Minneapolis: University of Minnesota Press. ISBN 0-8166-1799-6.
- Brown, Howard Mayer (1976). Embellishing Sixteenth-Century Music. Early Music Series 1. London: Oxford University Press. ISBN 0-19-323175-1.
- Collins, Michael; Carter, Stewart A.; Garden, Greer; Seletsky, Robert E. (2001). "Improvisation II: Western Art Music 3: The Baroque Period". In Stanley Sadie; John Tyrrell (eds.). The New Grove Dictionary of Music and Musicians (2nd ed.). London: Macmillan.
- Crutchfield, Will (1983). "Vocal Ornamentation in Verdi: The Phonographic Evidence". 19th-Century Music. 7 (1): 3–54. doi:10.2307/746545. JSTOR 746545. (subscription required)
- Dalla Casa, Girolamo. 1584. Il vero modo di diminuir, con tutte le sorti di stromenti di fiato, & corda, & di voce humana. 2 vols. Venice: Angelo Gardano. Facsimile reprint, in one volume, Bibliotheca musica Bononiensis, sezione 2, no. 23 (Bologna: Arnoldi Forni Editore).
- Foreman, Edward (2001). Late Renaissance Singing. Pro Music Press. ISBN 9781887117159.
- Fuller, Sarah (2002). "Organum, Discantus, Contrapunctus in the Middle Ages". In Thomas Christensen (ed.). The Cambridge History of Western Music Theory. Cambridge: Cambridge University Press. pp. 477–502. ISBN 0-521-62371-5.
- Ganassi, Silvestro. 1535. Opera Intitulata Fontegara: Laquale insegna a sonare di flauto ch'o tutta l'arte opportuna a esso instrumento massime il diminuire ilquale sara utile ad ogni istrumeno di fiato et chorde: et anchora a chi si dileta di canto. Venice: per Syluestro di Ganassi dal Fontego, Sonator dalla illustrissima signoria di Venetia hautor pprio. Facsimile reprints, Collezione di trattati e musiche antiche edite in fac-simile (Milan: Bollettino bibliografico musicale, 1934) and Bibliotheca musica Bononiensis, Sezione II, no. 18 (Bologna: Forni, 1969). German edition, translated and edited by Hildemarie Peter (Berlin-Lichterfeld: Robert Lienau, 1956). English edition with translation by Dorothy Swainson of Peter's German text (Berlin-Lichterfeld: Robert Lienau, 1959).
- Gorow, Ron (2002). Hearing and Writing Music: Professional Training for Today's Musician (2nd ed.). Gardena, California: September Publishing. ISBN 0-9629496-7-1.
- Griffiths, Paul (2001). "Improvisation §II: Western Art Music 6: The 20th Century". In Stanley Sadie; John Tyrrell (eds.). The New Grove Dictionary of Music and Musicians. London: Macmillan.
- Hamilton, Kenneth (2008). After the Golden Age: Romantic Pianism and Modern Performance. Oxford and New York: Oxford University Press. ISBN 978-0-195-17826-5.
- Horsley, Imogene (2001). "Improvisation II: Western Art Music 2: History to 1600". In Stanley Sadie; John Tyrrell (eds.). The New Grove Dictionary of Music and Musicians (2nd ed.). London: Macmillan.
- Hotteterre, Jacques-Martin. 1719. L'art de préluder: sur la flûte traversière, sur la flûte à bec, sur le hautbois et autres instruments de dessus, op. 7. Paris: Boivin. Facsimile reprints: recueillie par Michel Sanvoisin (Paris: A. Zurfluh, 1966), (Geneva: Minkoff, 1978) ISBN 2-8266-0672-7, and Archivum musicum: L'art de la flûte traversière 55 (Florence: SPES, 1999). ISBN 88-7242-779-7 Musical pieces edited by Erich Doflein and Nikolaus Delius as 48 Préludes in 24 Tonarten aus op. VII, 1719, für Altblockflöte (Querflöte, Oboe). Mainz: B. Schott's Söhne; New York: Schott Music, 1972.
- Ortiz, Diego. 1553. Trattado de glosas sobre clausulas y otros generos depuntos en la musica de violones. Nuevamente puestos en Luz (also in Italian, as El primo libro nel quale si tratta delle glose sopra le cadenze et altre sorte de punti in la musica del violone). 2 vols. Rome: Dorico. Facsimile reprint of the Italian edition, Archivum musicum 57 (Florence: Studio per edizioni scelte, 1984). Transcription, edition, and German translation by Max Schneider (Kassel: Bärenreiter, 1936).
- Santa Maria, Tomás de. 1565. Libro llamado Arte de tañer fantasia: assi para tecla como para vihuela, y todo instrumento, en que se pudiere tañer a tres, y a quatro vozes, y a mas ... Elqual por mandado del muy alto Consejo real fue examinado, y aprouado por el eminente musico de Su Magestad Antonio de Cabeçon, y por Iuan de Cabeçon, su hermano. Valladolid: F. Fernandez de Cordova. Facsimile editions: with an introduction in English by Denis Stevens (Farnborough, UK: Gregg International Publishers, 1972) ISBN 0-576-28229-4; Monumentos de la música española 75, edited by Luis Antonio González Marín, with the collaboration of Antonio Ezquerro Estaban, et al. (Barcelona: Consejo Superior de Investigaciones Científicas, Institución "Milà i Fontanals", Departamento de Musicología, 2007).ISBN 978-84-00-08541-4 English translation by Warren E. Hultberg and Almonte C. Howell Jr, as The Art of Playing the Fantasia (Pittsburgh, Pennsylvania.: Latin American Literary Review Press, 1991) ISBN 0-935480-52-8
- Savage, Steve (2011). Bytes and Backbeats – Repurposing Music in the Digital Age. University of Michigan Press. ISBN 9780472027736.
- Solomon, Maynard (1998). Beethoven (Second printing, 2001, ISBN 0-8256-7268-6) (2nd, revised ed.). New York; London: Schirmer Books; Prentice Hall International. ISBN 0-02-864717-3.
- Szwed, John F. (2000). Jazz 101: A Complete Guide to Learning and Loving Jazz. New York: Hyperion. ISBN 0-7868-8496-7.
- Von Gunden, Heidi (1983). The Music of Pauline Oliveros. Metuchen, New Jersey: Scarecrow Press. ISBN 0-8108-1600-8.
- Winkler, Peter (1978). "Toward a Theory of Pop Harmony". In Theory Only. 4 (2): 3–26.
