= Improvisation in music therapy =

In music therapy improvisation is defined as a process where the client and therapist relate to each other. The client makes up music, musical improvisation, while singing or playing, extemporaneously creating a melody, rhythm, song, or instrumental piece. In clinical improvisation, client and therapist (or client and other clients) relate to one another through the music. Improvisation may occur individually, in a duet, or in a group. The client may use any musical or nonmusical medium within their capabilities. Musical media includes voice, body sound, percussion, and string, wind, and keyboard instruments. Nonmusical media can consist of images, titles, and stories.

== How improvisation fits into music therapy ==
Music therapy is a systematic process; it is not a series of random events. Systematic means that music therapy is "purposeful, organized, methodical, knowledge-based, and regulated" (Bruscia 1998). One of the most important features is its methodical processes. Methodical means that music therapy always proceeds in an orderly fashion. It involves three basic steps: assessment, treatment, and evaluation. Treatment is the part of a music therapy process in which the therapist engages the client in various musical experiences, employing specific methods and in-the-moment techniques. When planning treatment, the music therapist has to select the types of music and music experiences that will be most relevant to the client. There are four basic types of music experiences, or methods, in which a client may be engaged: listening, re-creating, composition, and improvisation.

== Characteristics of improvisation in music therapy ==
Clinical Improvisation is a generative and creative process of musical intervention involving the client's spontaneous creation of sounds and music. It helps the client to explore aspects of self, in relation to others, in an appropriate way. Improvisation also generates new and individualized musical forms. Using musical improvisation in a therapeutic setting can increase independence. The interactive use of improvisation facilitates problem-solving, because it is flexible rather than predetermined. Getting the client involved in an improvisational experience can develop social skills and interaction.

== Clinical goals of improvisation experiences ==
According to Bruscia (1998), clinical goals that can be achieved through improvisation are as follows:

1. Establish a nonverbal channel of communication, and a bridge to verbal communication
2. Provide a fulfilling means of self-expression and identity formation
3. Explore various aspects of self in relation to others
4. Develop the capacity for interpersonal intimacy
5. Develop group skills
6. Develop creativity, expressive freedom, and playfulness with various degrees of structure
7. Stimulate and develop the senses
8. Play, on the spot, with a decisiveness that invites clarity of intention
9. Develop perceptual and cognitive skills

== Improvisational methods and their variations ==
Improvisation can be carried out with both musical and nonmusical references. (Bruscia 1987, 10)

- Referential improvisations are those in which the client improvises to portray a nonmusical reference (e.g., an event, feeling, image, relationship, etc.)
- Non-referential improvisations are those in which the client improvises without reference to anything other than the sounds or music.
- Frequently used variations are as follows:

| Variations | Explanations |
|---|---|
| Instrumental referential | creating music on a musical instrument according to a given reference |
| Instrumental non-referential | creating music on a musical instrument without reference |
| Song improvisation | creating lyrics, melody, and accompaniment to a song |
| Vocal non-referential | creating a vocal piece without words or images |
| Body improvisation | creating various kinds of body sounds |
| Mixed media | creating a piece with any combination of instrumental, vocal, or body sounds |
| Conducted improvisation | creating a piece by giving directive cues to one or more improvisers |

== Basic therapeutic techniques ==
Bruscia (1987) and Wigram (2004) introduced a variety of improvisational techniques in their books. Among these, there are a few major therapeutic techniques. Imitating is a basic technique of empathy in which the music therapist copies or repeats a client's response, after the response has been displayed. The music therapist focuses on any sound, rhythm, interval or even facial expression. Reflecting is a technique in which the music therapist expresses the same moods or feelings which have been presented by the client. Rhythmic grounding is implemented by establishing a steady beat or rhythm, supporting the client's improvisation. The use of a rhythmic ostinato is an example of rhythmic grounding. Dialoguing is a process in which the music therapist and the client communicate through their improvisations. Lastly, accompanying is a technique in which the music therapist supports the client's improvisation by giving an accompaniment that consists of rhythm, melody, and chord progressions.

== Integration of therapeutic methods ==
It is important to have variety in music therapy sessions. Improvisation should be conducted using more than just one or two methods and techniques. It is also critical to maintain flexibility during the improvisation. For example, the music therapist can preserve a flexible session flow by incorporating several methods, such as imitating, accompanying, dialoguing, and rhythmic grounding.

== Benefits of using Improvisation methods ==
Using Improvisation in musical therapy actually has specific benefits for those with neurological problems. These benefits can span from reducing anxiety and stress to improving communication and behavioral attention problems in younger adults/children. This is due to the proposed idea that musical therapy with improvisation links the unconscious and the conscious brain, promoting social and creative interaction. Many believe that it is a useful tool used to connected on a deeper level with patients in order to bring out these characteristics and benefits within themselves. Improvisation is a fun way to challenge the psyche of individuals and it shows to have very good results in promoting healthy benefits later on down the road.
