= Nordoff–Robbins music therapy =

Type of music therapy

Nordoff–Robbins music therapy is a type of creative music therapy developed for use with individuals with psychological, physical, and/or developmental disabilities. It was developed in 1958 by American composer and pianist Paul Nordoff and British special education teacher Clive Robbins.

== Approach and application ==
The method draws on ideas from Rudolf Steiner’s anthroposophy, and emphasises active engagement in music-making in an aim to support communication, self-expression, and personal development. Sessions typically involve composing music, including improvisation using instruments or voice. Training programs based on the Nordoff–Robbins approach are offered in several countries, with established centers in the United Kingdom, the United States, Australia, Germany, New Zealand, and South Africa.

== History ==
Before the establishment of The Nordoff-Robbins Center for Music Therapy, Robbins was employed in a special education role at the Sunfield Children's Home, a UK anthroposophical residential facility for children and adolescents with intellectual and emotional disabilities. He was interested in alternative treatment approaches for disabled youth.

At the time, Nordoff was a teacher at Bard College in New York and took a sabbatical to perform his musical compositions and improvisations. Robbins and Nordoff met in 1958 when Nordoff performed at the Sunfield Children's Home. After witnessing the effects of Nordoff's performance on the residents of Sunfield, Robbins and Nordoff began collaborating on a new form of music therapy, which would become the Nordoff-Robbins approach.

=== Nordoff-Robbins Center for Music Therapy ===
In 1989, Clive Robbins and his wife, Carol Robbins, established The Nordoff-Robbins Center for Music Therapy at the Steinhardt School of Culture at New York University. The centre is affiliated with New York University's Music Therapy Program. It offers music therapy for individuals with a range of disabilities, including autism spectrum disorder, behavioral disorders, developmental delays, sensory impairments, and psychiatric conditions. Additionally, the centre publishes research on the impact of music therapy for individuals with conditions including Autism Spectrum Disorder and hearing loss. The centre is visited by over 150 people annually, including music therapists, students, media professionals, and members of the public seeking resources or consultation.
