= Paul Nordoff =

American classical composer

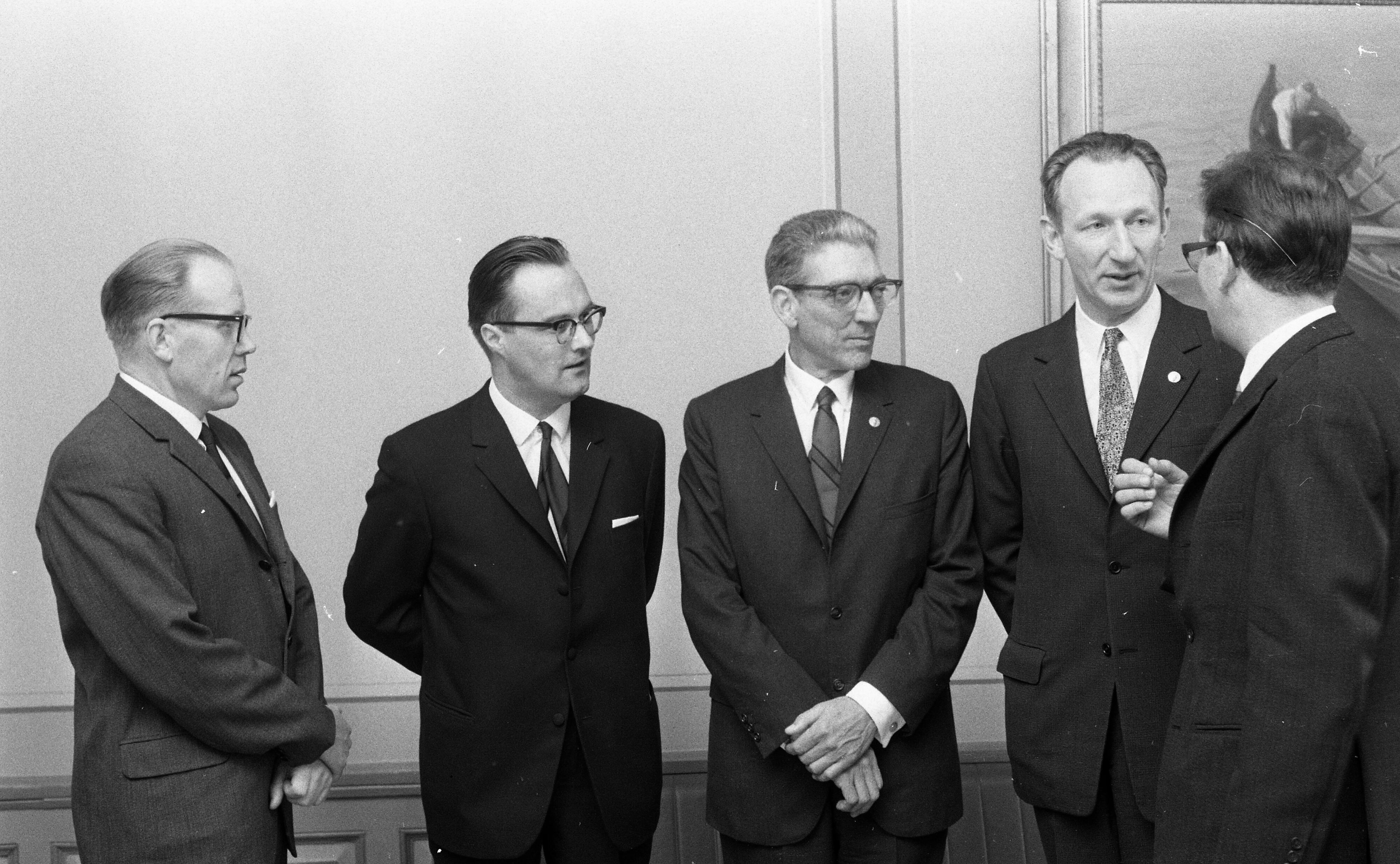
Paul Nordoff (third from the left) and Clive Robbins (fourth) during a visit to Finland in 1967.

Paul Nordoff (June 6, 1909 in Philadelphia, Pennsylvania – January 18, 1977 in Herdecke, North Rhine-Westphalia, West Germany) was an American composer and music therapist, anthroposophist and initiator of the Nordoff-Robbins method of music therapy. His music is generally tonal and neo-Romantic in style.

== Career ==
Born in Philadelphia, he studied the piano at the Philadelphia Conservatory of Music (later the University of the Arts), receiving a B.M. degree in 1927 and an M.M. degree in 1932. He later studied with Rubin Goldmark at the Juilliard School, and in 1960 he received a Bachelor of Music Therapy from the Combs College of Music in Philadelphia. He served as head of composition at the Philadelphia Conservatory (1938–1943), a teacher at Michigan State College (1945–1949), and professor of music at Bard College (1948–1959). While still a student he encountered the work of Rudolf Steiner and became a member of the Anthroposophical Society in 1943, visiting its centre in Dornach to lecture at the conferences held there on Music after 1954.

His work as a composer was acknowledged by two Guggenheim Fellowships (in 1933 and 1935) and the Pulitzer Traveling Fellowship for Music for his 1936 Piano Quintet (in 1940). (This was three years before the first Pulitzer Prize for Music was awarded.) In 1941, Nordoff performed his Theme and Variations for violoncello and piano with cellist Benar Heifetz in a concert of chamber music from the Americas at the Museum of Modern Art in New York City during the 1941 festival of the International Society for Contemporary Music. In 1958 he gave up his academic career, convinced of the power of music as therapy for disabled children. Encouraged by colleagues in research and psychology, he began his explorations with disabled children in Great Britain and Europe, teaming up with Dr Clive Robbins, a special educator committed to music as a medium of therapy.

From 1958 to 1960 Paul Nordoff worked in Sunfield Homes together with Michael Wilson and Dr Herbert Geuter, the son of founder Fried Geuter, both accomplished musicians conversant with the field of music therapy themselves. Thereafter he visited 26 institutions offering Special Needs education, introducing his methods in England, Scotland, Sweden, Denmark, the Netherlands, Switzerland and Germany.

Thereafter, they worked together in a research programme beginning in 1961 for two years, in which they treated children with severe handicap in public schools in Philadelphia by means of music therapy, with astonishing results on their ability to learn. Also autistic children were activated and enlivened through their therapy sessions with music.

He was married to the American Eurythmist Sabina Nordoff.

He composed the score to three of Martha Graham's ballets: Praeludium (1935), Every Soul Is a Circus (1939) and Salem Shore (1943).

Nordoff's music was published by Associated, Carl Fischer, Theodore Presser, and G. Schirmer.

Two films featuring their work were broadcast on BBC Television. In 1976, musicians and managers in the British music industry formed the Silver Clef fund-raising organization to support all the activities of the Centre.

== Nordoff-Robbins music therapy ==
Clive Robbins joined Sunfield as a teacher in 1954 and it was here that he met Paul Nordoff when he came to visit. Encouraged by Dr Herbert Geuter to play to one of the boys and observe the results, Paul Nordoff quickly became inspired by the potential of music to communicate something to severely disabled children. Clive Robbins, equally inspired, teamed up with him to research and develop what is known today as the Nordoff-Robbins method of music therapy, pioneered and still practiced at Sunfield today.

Nordoff-Robbins Music Therapy is an improvisational and compositional approach to individual and group therapy that resulted from the pioneering teamwork of Paul Nordoff and Clive Robbins over a period of 17 years. The early development of Nordoff-Robbins Music Therapy resulted from Nordoff and Robbins' similar philosophical background, the supportive environment of Sunfield Children's Home, the guidance of Herbert Geuter, M.D., and their courage. Since the 1959-1960 academic year, the application and practice of Nordoff-Robbins Music Therapy has undergone many changes. However, the pioneering spirit of Nordoff and Robbins manifested in that watershed year remains strong among contemporary Nordoff-Robbins music therapy practitioners.

Nordoff died in Herdecke, North Rhine-Westphalia, West Germany in 1977 at the age of 67.

== Books ==
=== Together with P. Grabbe ===
- Minute Stories of the Opera, N. Y. 1932;
- Five Melodies of Foster, F. C. transcribed for piano, N. Y. 1934;
- Variationen über einen Schuhplattler. Piano, Mainz 1935;
- Songs for Pianoforte Accompaniment, N. Y. 1938;

=== with Franklin Brewer ===
- I was born to be attractive: a one-act opera, Philadelphia 1941;
- Did Matisse find peace? A one-act opera, Philadelphia 1941;
- Art and the heart, Philadelphia 1941;
- Anthony’s Song Book: Ten Songs, o. O. 1950;
- Winter symphony, Louisville [1957];
- Songs and Poems of Robert Burns. New accompaniments for thirty songs, N. Y. [1959];
- Spirituals for children to sing and play, Bryn Mawr o. J.;
- Songs for children with resonator bells and piano, Bryn Mawr, 1962

=== with Clive Robbins ===
- Music Therapy for Handicapped Children: Investigations and Experience. New York, 1965.
- Music Therapy in Special Education. New York, 1971.
- Therapy in Music for Handicapped Children. New York, 1971.
- Creative Music Therapy: Individualized Treatment for the Handicapped Child. New York, 1977.
- The Story of Artaban, Bryn Mawr 1964
- The Children’s Christmas Play Clive Robbins and Paul Nordoff Bryn Mawr, Pennsylvania
- Children’s Play Songs 5 Books by Paul Nordoff and Clive Robbins Bryn Mawr, Pennsylvania
- A Message For The King, Paul Nordoff and Clive Robbins, Bryn Mawr, Pennsylvania
- The Three Bears by Paul Nordoff and Clive Robbins, Theodore Presser Company

== Discography ==
- Five Songs by Dia DiCristino [The only recording known for Nordoff's White Nocturne]
- Winter Symphony Louisville Orchestra, Robert Whitney, conductor [commissioned by the Louisville Orchestra, recorded in 1955 and released on Louisville Records LOU-571]

== See also ==
- Joseph H. Bearns Prize
