= Clive Robbins =

British music therapist

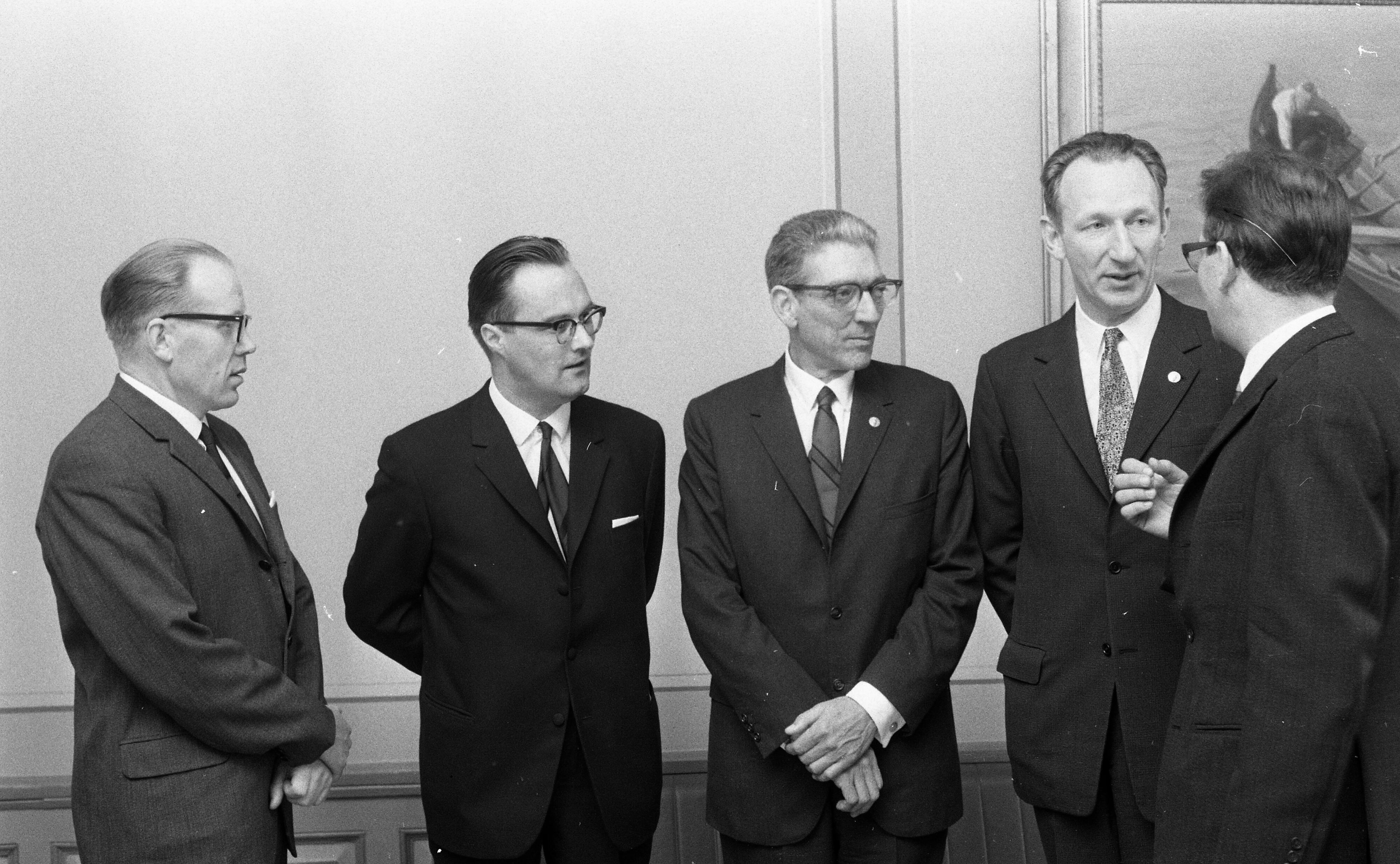
Clive Robbins (fourth from the left) during a visit to Finland in 1967. The third man from the left is Paul Nordoff.

Clive Robbins (23 July 1927 in Handsworth, West Midlands – 7 December 2011 in New York) was a British music therapist, Special Needs educator, anthroposophist and co-founder of Nordoff–Robbins music therapy.

== Early years ==
Born on 23 July 1927 in Handsworth, Birmingham as the son of a baker, Clive Robbins did not discover until he was 17 that the woman he had always been told was his older sister, was actually his mother, due to prejudices surrounding the issue of illegitimacy at the time. He started life somewhat disoriented and in search of meaning and purpose. During the World War II, he was sent away to foster parents. Here he was able to hear classical music and take piano lessons.

While in the RAF at 18, Clive was injured by a bullet that nearly killed him, leaving his left hand and arm partially paralysed and dashing his hopes of becoming a pianist. Instead, he attempted photography and painting but found no vocation until becoming a teacher in 1954 at Sunfield Children's Home, a Rudolf Steiner 'curative educational community' for mentally disabled children in the Clent Grove, Stourbridge. He described it as "the first profoundly fulfilling experience of my life". He and his wife Mildred lived with their two children, Tobias and Jennifer, on the grounds of the school in a small trailer.

== Sunfield Homes ==
It was in 1958 at Sunfield that Clive met Paul Nordoff, who was an eminent American composer and pianist. Paul Nordoff was always fascinated by Steiner's philosophy, known as anthroposophy, and was so impressed by what he found at Sunfield that he went on to explore his growing interest in the therapeutic potential of music. In 1959, Clive Robbins teamed up with Paul Nordoff and pioneered an extraordinary new way of reaching and engaging disabled children through musical improvisation, music therapy being practically unknown at the time.

Paul Nordoff and Clive Robbins were both involved in the thinking and practice of Anthroposophy previous to their meeting. "Our studies of anthroposophy had independently instilled in each of us an attitude of reverence for the destiny of humanity as a whole and the meaningfulness of each human existence" Robbins later wrote, going on to describe the individual music therapy work that they soon began together at Sunfield as "creative empiricism" (Robbins, 2005, p. 10).

The time Paul Nordoff spent at Sunfield in 1959-60 working with Clive Robbins was life-changing. The two men formed a close relationship and carried out experimental musical work with many of the most disabled and unreachable children who bore tragic lives of distress and self-injury. With the help of carefully chosen harmonies, appealing melodies and rhythms, the children were drawn into musical participation developing increased social and self-awareness, discipline and concentration. Placed in front of a snare drum and cymbal, they revealed their sensitivities and their expressive, receptive and relational abilities in their musical responses. It was a profound discovery of how music could be used for human benefit and Paul and Clive documented their observations and techniques in painstaking detail, making and transcribing recordings of their sessions.

== Nordoff-Robbins music therapy ==
When Paul left Sunfield in June 1960 Clive accompanied him, gripped by the urge to continue what they had started. They visited 26 curative homes across Europe, giving illustrated presentations and live demonstrations of their work, then spent the next six years in Philadelphia exploring and establishing the work which they called therapy in music. A research grant from the National Institute of Mental Health supported them in this. There followed seven years in Europe where Paul and Clive worked as Lecturing Fellows of the American-Scandinavian Foundation from 1967 to 1974. This period saw the fruition of their work together with teaching engagements across Europe, the evolution of music therapy training for musicians, publications and television documentaries about their work.

In the 1960s and 1970s, Paul and Clive toured the world demonstrating their work, with groups of followers starting to work wherever they went. After Paul Nordoff's died in 1977, Robbins continued his music therapy work, teaching and lecturing well into his 80s.

In 1975, Clive returned to the US where he married his second wife Carol Matteson, also a music therapist. Together they worked at the New York State School for the Deaf in Rome, NY (1975–81), at Southern Methodist University, Dallas (1981–82), continuing courses and lectures and maintaining ties in Europe with annual teaching engagements. From 1982 until 1989 they lived in Australia where they established a Music Therapy Centre at Warrah, an anthroposophical disability service centre and biodynamic farm, and a Nordoff-Robbins Association in Australia. In 1989 a dream was fulfilled with the establishment of the Nordoff-Robbins Center for Music Therapy at New York University, of which Clive and Carol became Co-Directors. The new Centre served as a music therapy clinic and training venue for music therapists in the Nordoff-Robbins approach. Here Clive stayed active until his death, becoming Founding Director in 1998.

== Final years ==
After Carol's untimely death in 1996, Clive married another music therapist, Kaoru Mochizuki, with whom he worked and lectured also in the Far East - Japan, Taiwan and Korea.

Clive saw the establishment in 1996 of the International Trust for Nordoff-Robbins Music Therapy which came into being to preserve the name and reputation of Nordoff Robbins and to hold the worldwide intellectual property assets arising from the work of Paul Nordoff and Clive Robbins. He held honorary doctorates from Combs College of Music, Philadelphia, the University of Witten-Herdecke, Germany, and the State University of New York.

== Published work ==
- Music Therapy for Handicapped Children: Investigations and Experience. New York, 1965.
- Music Therapy in Special Education. New York, 1971.
- Therapy in Music for Handicapped Children. New York, 1971.
- Creative Music Therapy: Individualized Treatment for the Handicapped Child. New York, 1977.
- The Story of Artaban, Bryn Mawr 1964
- The Children’s Christmas Play Clive Robbins and Paul Nordoff Bryn Mawr, Pennsylvania
- Children’s Play Songs 5 Books by Paul Nordoff and Clive Robbins Bryn Mawr, Pennsylvania
- A Message For The King, Paul Nordoff and Clive Robbins, Bryn Mawr, Pennsylvania
- The Three Bears by Paul Nordoff and Clive Robbins, Theodore Presser Company* Die schöpferische Musiktherapie, Stuttgart 1986
