= Hōhepa =

New Zealand opera composed by Jenny McLeod

- by Jenny McLeod
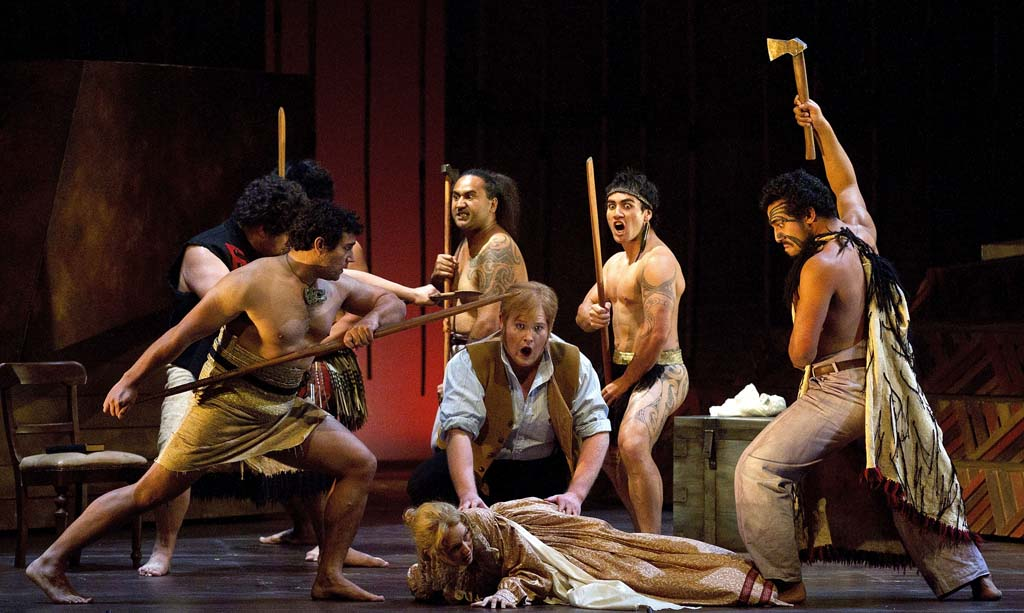
- Librettist: Jenny McLeod
- Language: English, Māori
- Premiere: 15 March 2012; Opera House, Wellington

The opera Hōhepa, composed by Jenny McLeod, premiered at the Opera House in Wellington in March 2012, in a production by NBR New Zealand Opera. It starred Phillip Rhodes, Deborah Wai Kapohe, Jonathan Lemalu, and Rawiri Paratene. It relates the true story of the friendship between Māori chief Hōhepa Te Umuroa and English colonist Thomas Mason during the New Zealand Wars.

== Plot ==
The story of Hōhepa is centred on Hōhepa Te Umuroa (Te Āti Haunui-a-Pāpārangi, 1820?–1847), living in the Hutt Valley near Wellington in the 1840s. Hōhepa is befriended by Pākehā (white New Zealander) settlers Thomas and Jane Mason. The local Māori become disillusioned with the arrival of colonists, and land disputes lead to bloodshed; the Masons depart for Tasmania. Newly-appointed Governor of New Zealand Sir George Grey identifies Hōhepa as a rebel; he and other Māori are captured and sentenced to hard labour for life in the penal colony of Tasmania, and their land is confiscated. Mason, who speaks Māori, volunteers to translate for the newly-arrived prisoners, but realises Hōhepa is among them. Hōhepa dies of tuberculosis in 1847 and is buried on Maria Island. The opera is book-ended by the 1988 repatriation of Hōhepa's remains to New Zealand by his descendants after 150 years.

== Premiere ==
The first production of Hōhepa was at the 2012 International Festival of the Arts in Wellington. It was directed by Sara Brodie in the Wellington Opera House, with 12 Vector Wellington Orchestra musicians conducted by Marc Taddei. The choreographer was Taiaroa Royal. The role of Hōhepa was sung by Phillip Rhodes.
