= Thomas Mason (New Zealand politician) =

New Zealand quaker, runholder, horticulturalist and MP

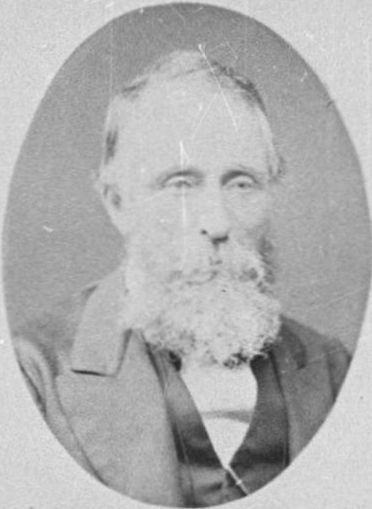
Thomas Mason in 1882

Thomas Mason (28 July 1818 – 11 June 1903) was a New Zealand quaker, runholder, horticulturalist and Member of Parliament.

== Biography ==
New Zealand Parliament
Years	Term	Electorate	Party
1879–1881	7th	Hutt	Independent
1881–1884	8th	Hutt	Independent

He was born in York, Yorkshire, England, on 28 July 1818. He attended Bootham School, York.

He was not elected in the 1879 by-election for the Hutt, but was successful in the subsequent general election. He represented the Hutt electorate from 1879 to 1884, when he was defeated.

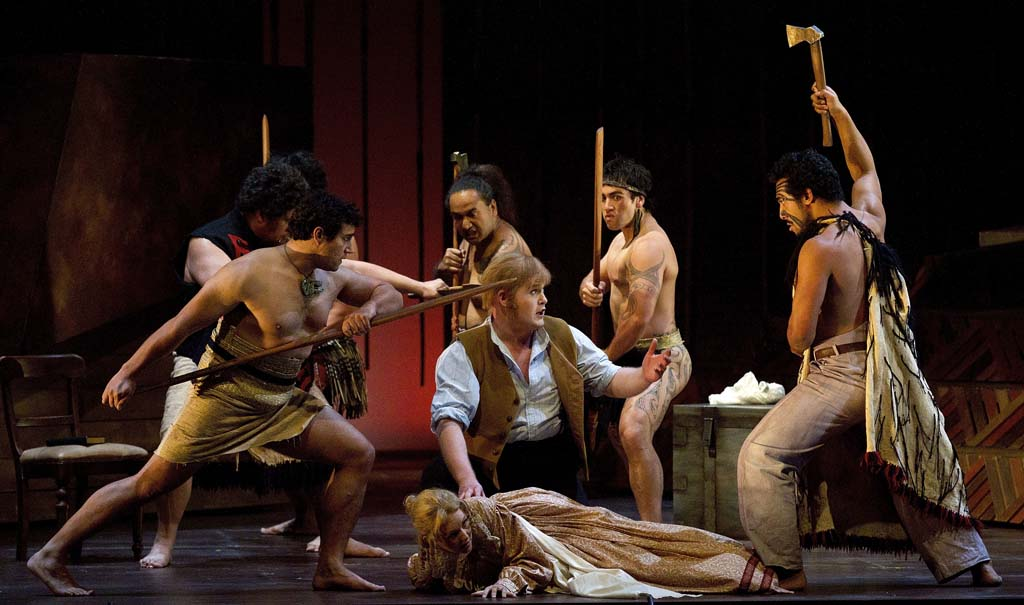
Thomas Mason (played by Nicky Spence) in the opera Hōhepa. Also Jenny Wollerman who plays Jane Mason (on floor) Phillip Rhodes (L) who plays Hōhepa and chorus (March 2012).

He was chairman of both the Wellington Botanic Garden Board and Hutt County Council. Mason Street in the Lower Hutt suburb of Moera was named after him.

His daughter, Elizabeth Catherine Mason, was the mother of Thomas Wilford. Mason died at his home in the Hutt and was buried at Taita Cemetery.

In 2012 the New Zealand International Arts Festival premiered the opera Hōhepa composed by Jenny McLeod about the relationship between Mason and Māori chief Hōhepa Te Umuroa. The opera is set in the Hutt Valley where they met and also Tasmania, Australia.

New Zealand Parliament
Preceded by Henry Jackson	Member of Parliament for Hutt; 1879–1884	Succeeded by Henry Samuel Fitzherbert
