= Wellington Brass Band =

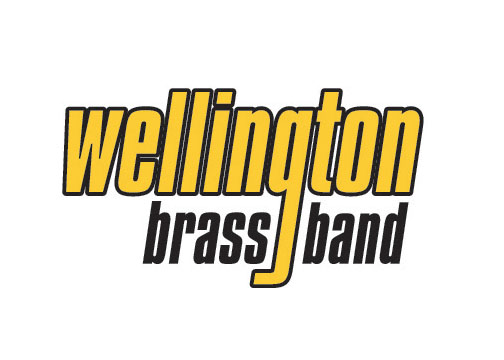

Background information
- Also known as: Evening Post Onslow Brass Band, Pelorus Trust Wellington Brass
- Origin: Wellington, New Zealand
- Genre: Brass Band
- Years active: 1905–present
- Members: Music Director; David Bremner; Assistant Music Director; Reuben Brown; Band Manager; Patrick Di Somma
- Website: www.wellingtonbrass.net.nz

The Wellington Brass Band (Wellington Brass, WBB) is a British-style brass band based in Wellington, New Zealand. The 28-piece ensemble is registered contesting band in the New Zealand A Grade (Championship Section). The band performs extensively throughout New Zealand and Australia, and was the champion band of New Zealand.

== Ensemble ==
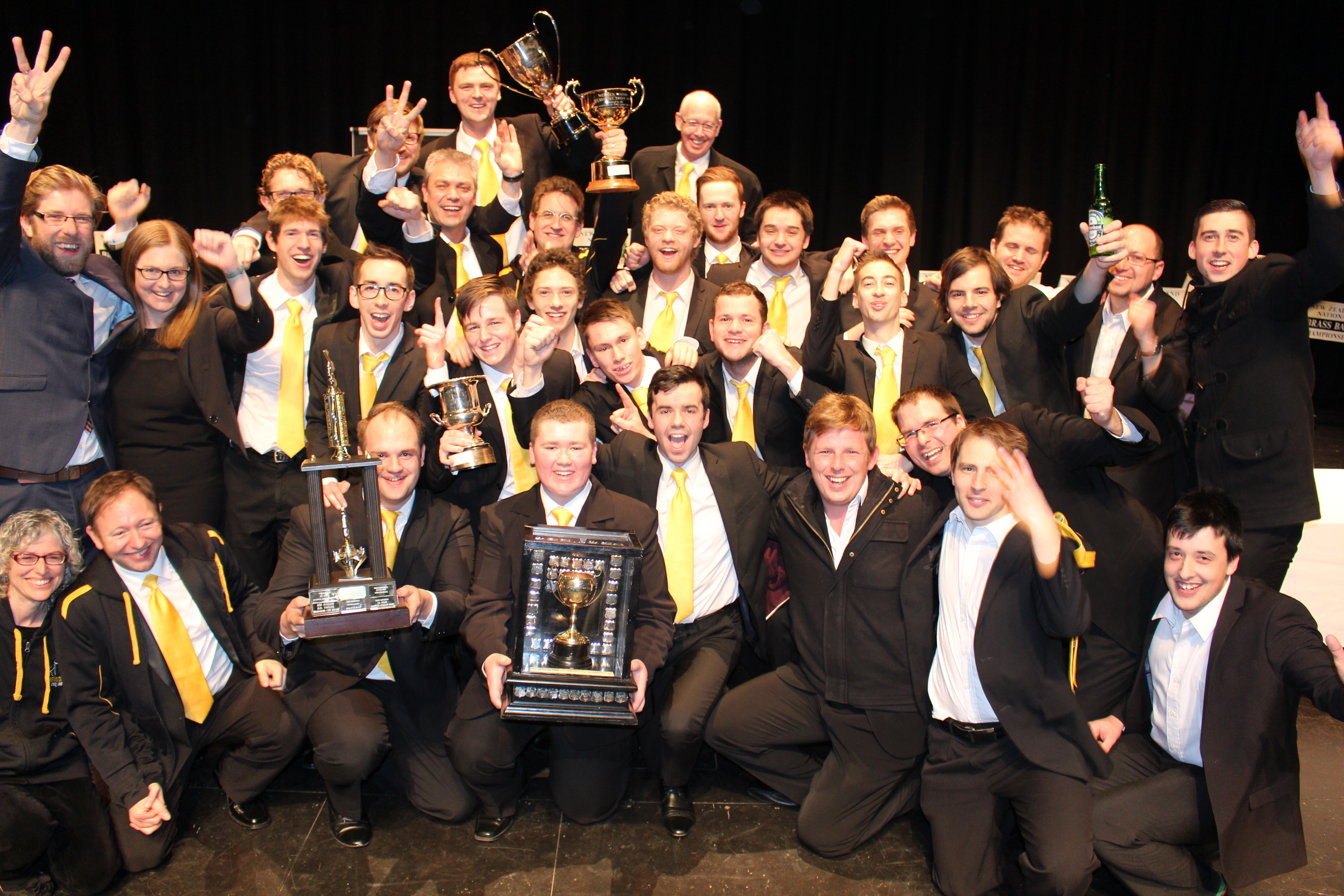
Wellington Brass celebrate a hat-trick of NZ titles

The band's original name was the "Wellington Corporation Tramways Band" and it was formed in 1905. For over 50 years the band retained close links with the tramways staff (many were playing members) and its practice rooms were a hall adjacent to the Newtown tram sheds. The band moved to its present location at the west side of the Ngaio Railway Station, off Collingwood Street in 1964. At this stage it had recently changed its name to Onslow Brass Band. The Ngaio hall had been built by local Returned Services Association members and the band was eventually able to first, acquire the building and then, second, buy the land. After many years of fundraising a new band room was built and this was officially opened by the Mayor of Wellington, Ms Kerry Prendergast, on Saturday 5 April 2003. The next major milestone was when the band accepted an offer of sponsorship from the "Evening Post", Wellington's premier newspaper. This was a very happy association for both parties. In 1981, in recognition of The Evening Post becoming the band's principal sponsor, the band adopted it as part of its name: The Evening Post Onslow Brass Band. That year the band won its second National A Grade title under the late Norman Goffin QSO (Musical Director 1960–83). In 1998, after consultation with The Evening Post, the band changed its name to The Evening Post Wellington Brass Band, to better reflect its position as the city's sole brass band, and the Wellington Region's only A-Grade band. With the merging of The Evening Post and The Dominion newspapers in 2002, Wellington Brass began the search for a new principal sponsor.

Today, under the leadership of current musical director David Bremner, Wellington Brass has had its most successful contesting period winning a hat-trick of NZ National titles and doing "the double" by winning the Australian and NZ titles in the same year (2015). Wellington Brass has been the only band to achieve seven consecutive National titles (2025).

In 2013 Wellington Brass organised the inaugural Oktoberfest: The Bavarian Showdown on Wellington's waterfront which was attended by thousands of Wellingtonians.

Wellington Brass collaborates with a number of Wellington-based ensembles, including the New Zealand Symphony Orchestra, Orpheus Choir, Orchestra Wellington, and the Royal New Zealand Air Force Band.

In film and television, Wellington Brass has featured on Season 2 of Guy Williams' satirical news show 'New Zealand Today' and recorded the soundtrack for the film Red, White and Brass (2023).

The band has a highly active involvement in music education and teaching in the community, performing at many primary schools each year to promote and encourage kids to get involved in music.

== National titles ==
- 1911 B Grade Championship- Palmerston North
- 1937 B Grade Quickstep, Championship – Nelson
- 1953 C Grade Championship – Wanganui
- 1963 B Grade Quickstep – Wellington
- 1965 B Grade Championship – Auckland
- 1969 A Grade Championship – Rotorua
- 1971 A Grade Hymn – Wanganui
- 1973 A Grade Test – Wellington
- 1981 A Grade Hymn, Test, Championship – Wellington
- 1982 A Grade Own Choice – Dunedin
- 1983 A Grade Test – Sydney (Aus)
- 2005 B Grade Hymn, Test, Own Choice, Championship – Wellington
- 2007 B Grade Test, Own Choice, Championship – Auckland
- 2008 B Grade Test, Own Choice, Championship – Christchurch
- 2008 B Grade Hymn, Test, Own Choice, Championship – Brisbane (Aus)
- 2012 A Grade Hymn, Test – Timaru
- 2013 A Grade Hymn, Test, Championship – New Plymouth
- 2014 A Grade Hymn, Test, Championship – Invercargill
- 2015 A Grade Hymn, Own Choice, Stage March, Championship – Sydney (Aus)
- 2015 A Grade Hymn, Own Choice, Championship – Rotorua
- 2016 A Grade Test, Own Choice, Championship – Napier
- 2018 A Grade Hymn, Own Choice, Championship – Blenheim
- 2019 A Grade Hymn, Test, Own Choice, Championship – Hamilton
- 2021 A Grade Hymn, Test, Championship – Christchurch
- 2022 A Grade Hymn, Test, Championship – Wellington
- 2023 A Grade Hymn, Test, Own Choice, Championship – Dunedin
- 2024 A Grade Hymn, Test, Own Choice, Championship – Manukau
- 2025 A Grade Test, Own Choice, Championship – Christchurch

== Musical directors ==
- G. Bowes 1920–21
- T. Goodall 1921–29
- E. Franklin 1930–45, 1948–53
- B. Zinsli 1945–48
- N. Goffin QSM 1953–60, 60–1983
- D. Bly 1983–86, 95–96
- P. Swartz 1986–92
- A. McFarlane 1993
- H. Aldred 1994
- D. Brell 1996–97, 1999–2001
- G. Moverley 1997–98
- A. McFarlane 2001–2003
- C. Collings 2003–04
- D. Chaulk 2004–05
- M. Oldershaw 2005–06
- D. Bremner 2006–17
- N. Seaman 2018
- D. Bremner 2019–Present
