= Margaret Medlyn =

New Zealand soprano

Margaret Medlyn ONZM
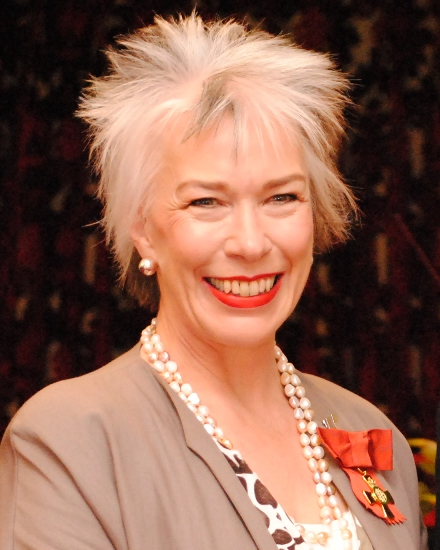
- Medlyn in 2012
- Born: 7 October 1955 (age 71); Falmouth, Cornwall, England
- Citizenship: New Zealand
- Occupations: Operatic soprano; singing teacher
- Relatives: Helen Medlyn (sister)

Academic background
- Education: Victoria University of Wellington
- Thesis: Embodying Voice: Singing Verdi, singing Wagner (2016)
- Doctoral advisor: Inge van Rij; Elizabeth Hudson

Margaret Medlyn ONZM (born 7 October 1955) is a New Zealand opera singer and voice teacher. First a mezzo-soprano, then a soprano, she performed title roles such as Verdi's Aida and Puccini's Tosca with the Wellington Opera, and appeared as a guest internationally. In 2012, Medlyn was appointed an Officer of the New Zealand Order of Merit, for services to opera. Her 2016 dissertation, entitled Embodying Voice: Singing Verdi, singing Wagner from Victoria University of Wellington was published.

== Early life and education ==
Medlyn was born in Falmouth, Cornwall, England, on 7 October 1955, and emigrated with her family to New Zealand in the early 1960s when she was five. She grew up in West Auckland and was educated at Henderson High School. Medlyn studied music at the University of Auckland, earning a Bachelor of Music degree. She became a naturalised New Zealand citizen in 1978.

Medlyn's sister, Helen Medlyn, is also an opera singer.

== Career ==
Medlyn made her operatic debut in London, singing the title role in Der Rosenkavalier by Richard Strauss with Opera Viva, and then spent four years with Kent Opera. She then returned to New Zealand and performed with the Wellington Opera in roles such as Cherubino in Mozart's Le nozze di Figaro, Azucena in Verdi's Il trovatore, the title role of Bizet's Carmen, and Floßhilde in Wagner's Das Rheingold. Although she started out as a mezzo-soprano, her voice gradually changed to the soprano range, turning to roles such as Musetta in Puccini's La bohème, Verdi's Aida and Puccini's Tosca. Medlyn appeared at the Opera of South Australia, in 1999 as Leonora in Verdi's Il trovatore and in 2002 as Kundry in Wagner's Parsifal. She performed with Opera Australia, in 2001 as Giorgetta in Puccini's Il tabarro and in 2002 as Agathe in Weber's Der Freischütz. She portrayed Marie in Alban Berg's Wozzeck at the Melbourne Opera in 2001. At the Vienna State Opera, she performed as Helmwige in Wagner's Die Walküre in 2002. She appeared at the Royal Opera House in London, with the English National Opera, and with the New Zealand Symphony Orchestra, the Sydney Symphony and the Malaysian Philharmonic. Her roles have also included the title role of Salome by R. Strauss, Puccini's Turandot, and Isolde in Wagner's Tristan und Isolde. Her 2008 portrayal of the Kostelnicka in Janáček's Jenůfa was considered remarkable.

Medlyn joined the New Zealand School of Music in 2007, and was head of voice at Victoria University of Wellington. She has also taught at the New Zealand Opera School. Medlyn completed a PhD titled Embodying Voice: Singing Verdi, singing Wagner at Victoria University of Wellington in 2016, which was later published by Routledge. She is a national recording artist for Radio New Zealand, recording a number of recitals and releasing four CDs.

Medlyn is a vice patron of the Orpheus Choir in Wellington.

== Honours and awards ==
In the 2012 Queen's Birthday and Diamond Jubilee Honours, Medlyn was appointed an Officer of the New Zealand Order of Merit, for services to opera.

== Publications ==
- Burning Bright featuring the work of four New Zealand women composers, Kiwi Pacific label (1999)
- In a strange land: the songs of Richard Fuchs, for Rollover Productions (2011)
- From Garden to Grave Jenny Macleod's settings of text by Katherine Mansfield, Waiteate Music Press (2011)
- Sojourn, Cages for the Wind, Stephan Prock’s setting of poems by Alistair Te Ariki Campbell
- Medlyn, Margaret (2019). Embodying Voice: Singing Verdi, Singing Wagner. Routledge. ISBN 978-1-138-58554-6.
