= Jonathan Lemalu =

New Zealand singer (born 1976)

Jonathan Lemalu ONZM
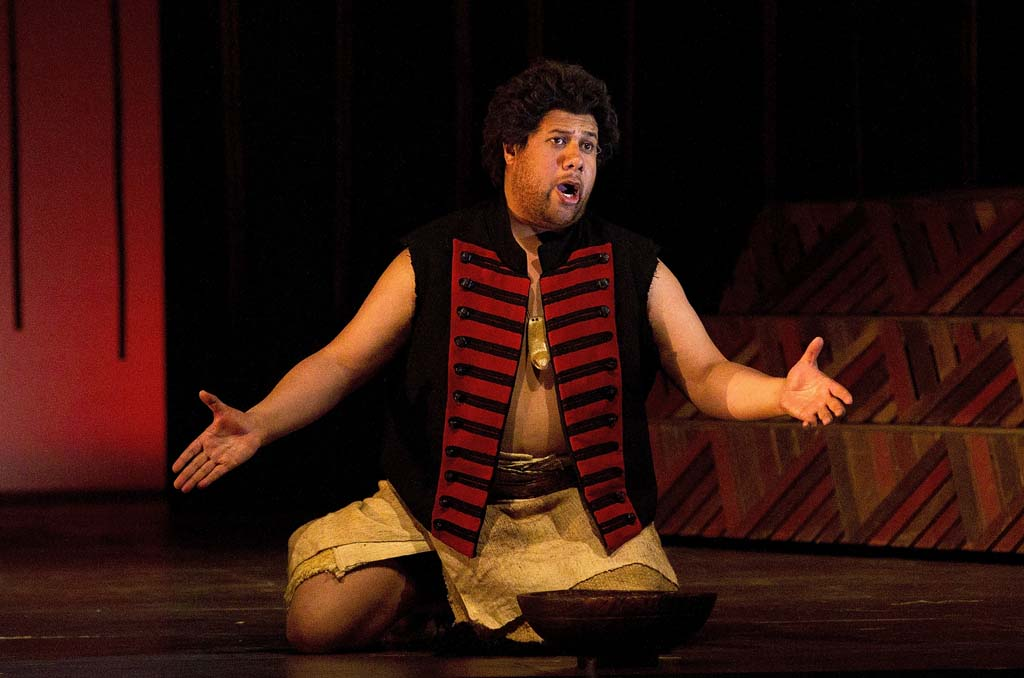
- Lemalu performing in Hōhepa by Jenny McLeod, 2012

Background information
- Born: 1976 (age 49–50)
- Occupation: Opera singer

Jonathan Fa'afetai Lemalu ONZM (born 1976) is a New Zealand bass baritone opera singer. Born to Samoan parents who had emigrated to New Zealand, he was educated in Dunedin. His first singing teacher was Honor McKellar, who began teaching him while he attended Otago Boys' High School. He studied both Law and Music at the University of Otago, graduating with a Bachelor of Laws in 1999.

Lemalu studied at the Royal College of Music (RCM), where he won the college's gold medal award in 2002. He won the prestigious London-based Kathleen Ferrier Award (previously won by Malvina Major in 1966) that same year. He was a BBC Radio 3 New Generation Artist from 2002 to 2004. He was the 2004 winner of the Royal Philharmonic Society's award for Young Artist of the Year. At the 52nd Annual Grammy Awards Lemalu was a co-recipient of the Grammy Award for Best Opera Recording for his work on Benjamin Britten's Billy Budd.

He returned to New Zealand to perform in the 2012 New Zealand Festival of the Arts in Wellington. He took the part of Te Kumete in the opera Hōhepa by Jenny McLeod which told the story of political prisoner Hōhepa Te Umuroa. In 2013 he was awarded the Senior Pacific Artist Award at the Creative New Zealand Arts Pasifka Awards.

Lemalu was made a Fellow of the Royal College of Music (FRCM) in 2022 in recognition of his services to music and to the College. In May 2026 Lemalu was awarded an honorary Doctor of Music degree by the University of Otago.

Lemalu's wife is a Croatian family therapist, Sandra Martinović. They live in London with their son Joshua and daughter Arabella. He is currently a professor of Vocal Studies at the Guildhall School of Music and Drama.

== Honours and awards ==
- 1997 Dame Sister Mary Leo Scholarship.
- 1998 New Zealand Mobil Song Quest.
- 1999 Australia's McDonald's Operatic Aria Contest at the Sydney Opera House.
- 2000 Inaugural Llangollen International Singer 2000 Competition.
- RCM Graziella Sciutti Recital Prize.
- RCM Keith Faulkner Oratorio Prize.
- 2000 LASMO Staffa Singers Prize.
- Bruce Millar/Gulliver Award for Young Opera Singers (Glasgow).
- Overall winner of the Royal Over-Seas League Competition (and Royal Over-Seas League Singers Prize, and Overseas Award).
- Richard Tauber Prize for Singers (Wigmore Hall).
- Concert FM Broadcasting Artist of the Year (NZ).
- 2000 recipient of the RCM Queen Elizabeth The Queen Mother Rosebowl (presented by HRH Prince Charles) and NFMS Alfreda Hodgson Prize.
- Queen Elizabeth the Queen Mother Scholar.
- President Emerita Scholar, Leverhulme Trust Scholar, Tillet Trust Scholar and Singers Academy Scholar at the RCM.
- BBC Radio 3 New Generation Artist 2002-2004
- Grammy Award for Best Opera Recording soloist on Britten: Billy Budd at 52nd Annual Grammy Awards 2010
- 2022 – Appointed an Officer of the New Zealand Order of Merit, for services to opera, in the 2022 Queen's Birthday and Platinum Jubilee Honours
