= Boris Pigovat =

Israeli composer (born 1953)

Boris Pigovat (Hebrew: בוריס פיגובט; born 1953 in Odesa, USSR) is an Israeli composer. Many of his works have been performed throughout the world. He studied at the Gnessin Music Institute in Moscow. Between 1978 and 1990 he lived in Tajikistan, and immigrated to Israel in 1990. In 2002 he received his Ph.D. degree from Bar-Ilan University.

In 1988 he won the special distinction diploma at the International Composers Competition in Budapest for his composition Musica dolorosa No. 2 for Trombone quartet.

In 1995 he received an ACUM Prize for his composition Requiem "The Holocaust" for viola & symphony orchestra. The world premiere of Requiem took place at the Memorial evening dedicated to the Babi Yar tragedy (Kyiv, 2.10.2001). It was performed by soloist Rainer Moog (Germany) and the symphony orchestra of the Ukrainian National Philharmonic Society], conducted by Roman Kofman. In 2008 it was performed in Wellington, New Zealand, at the Concert of Remembrance 70th Anniversary of Kristallnacht, by soloist Donald Maurice and Vector Wellington Orchestra, conducted by Marc Taddei. In 2010, "Atoll" (NZ) has launched a Requiem CD] with a live recording based on a concert. In addition to Requiem, 3 more compositions were recorded in performance of Donald Maurice and included in the CD: "PRAYER" for viola and piano], "The Silent Music" for viola and harp], and "Nigun" for string quartet.

In 2000 he received the prize of the Prime Minister of State of Israel.

His composition "Massada" was performed at "World music days 2000" festival in Luxembourg and at the 2003 WASBE Conference in Jonkoping (Sweden).

The symphonic picture “Wind of Yemen” was performed at the Asian Music Festival 2003 in Tokyo and at the 2009 WASBE 2009 Conference in Cincinnati (US).

In 2005 he received an ACUM Prize for his piece "Song of the Sea", a poem for symphonic band, which was performed in New York’s Carnegie Hall.

== Works ==
Pigovat composed for symphony and string orchestras, symphonic bands and chamber ensembles, solo and choir, including

SYMPHONY ORCHESTRA

- REQUIEM "THE HOLOCAUST" (1994–1995) for Viola and Symphony Orchestra
- "LEST WE FORGET" (2010) Poem for Symphony Orchestra
- "POEM OF DAWN" (2010) Romantic Music for Viola and Symphony Orchestra
- "MAGICAL GARDEN" (2009) Poem for Symphony Orchestra
- "A SONG OF ASCENTS" (2007)
- SUITE FOR PERCUSSION & SYMPHONY ORCHESTRA (1998)
- "TACHANUN" ("SUPPLICATION") (1996)
- BOTTICELLI'S "BIRTH OF VENUS" (1996) for Violin and Symphony Orchestra
- "JERUSALEM" (1993) Fantasia-Poem for Symphony Orchestra
- "MUSICA DOLOROSA" (1986 revised 1990)
- SYMPHONY NO.1 "MEMORIAL" (1984 revised 1987)
- SYMPHONIETTA (1984)

STRING ORCHESTRA (Click here for detailed list)

- "JEWISH WEDDING" (2008) for Clarinet and String Orchestra
- "NIGUN" (1996)
- "IN ARGENTINIAN STYLE" (2008) for String Orchestra (option - for Flute & Strings)
- "TZFAT" (Safed) (2004) Klezmer Rhapsody for Violin and String Orchestra
- "DEDICATED TO MARC CHAGALL" ("HAVA NAGILA")(2003) Jewish Rhapsody for String Orchestra (option: Str & Pno)
- "THE 5th JEREMIAH’S LAMENTATION" (2001)
- "TOCCATA" (1997)
- "THE LITTLE MERMAID" (1994) Based on the tale by H.-C. Andersen
- VARIATIONS "JONATAN" (1984)
- SYMPHONY NO.2 (1989)

SYMPHONIC BAND / WIND ENSEMBLE / BRASS ENSEMBLE (Click here for detailed list)

- LEST WE FORGET (2009) Poem for Symphonic Wind Band
- "WIND OF YEMEN" (2000) Picture for Symphonic Wind Band
- "SONG OF THE SEA" (2005) Poem for Symphonic Wind Band
- CONCERT MARCH (2006)
- "MASSADA" (1997) Poem for Symphonic Wind Band
- "ON MOUNT SINAI" (2004) Poem for Symphonic Wind Band
- ORIENTAL OVERTURE (2007)
- "EXILE" (2006)
- "THE RUSSIAN SOUVENIR" (2006)
- "IDYLL" (2006)
- "FOUR FAIRY-TALES" (2005)
- "THE FANFARE OF INDEPENDENCE" (2004)
- "DIES IRAE" (2001) Poem for Symphonic Wind Band
- "DEDICATED TO MARC CHAGALL" ("HAVA NAGILA") (2003) Jewish Rhapsody for Wind Orchestra
- "DEDICATED TO MARC CHAGALL" ("HAVA NAGILA") (2003) Version for Brass Ensemble
- "TZFAT" (Safed) (2002) Klezmer Rhapsody for Trombone and Wind Orchestra
- "DEDICATED TO "KAMARINSKAYA" (2001) For Wind Ensemble
- "KINNERET'S SONGS" (2001) Fantasia for Wind Orchestra, based on Israeli songs
- "SHALOM ALECHEM" (2001) Jewish traditional tune, arranged for Wind Orchestra
- TOCCATA for Percussion Instruments & Wind Orchestra (1999)
- "THE HEROIC SONG" (1998) Poem for Symphonic Wind Band
- "PASTORALE & BURLESQUE" (1997)

CHAMBER ENSEMBLES (Click here for detailed list)

- Botticelli's "Magnificat" for viola and piano (2010)
- "NIGUN" Version for String Quartet (2010)
- "JEWISH WEDDING" (2008) Version for Clarinet and String Quartet
- "THE SHORT MUSICAL TRAVEL" (2008) For 2 Marimbas
- THREE PIECES FOR FLUITE QUINTET (2008)
- BOTTICELLI'S "SPRING" (2007) For Piccolo & Harp
- TWO PIECES (1999) For Tuba & Piano
- "THE SILENT MUSIC" (1997) For Viola & Harp (versions for Viola & Piano, Violin & Piano, Clarinet & Harp)
- "SHULAMIT" (1996) For Flute, Bassoon & Harp
- "IZKOR" (1996) For 3 Marimbas & Timpani
- "THE SCARLET SAIL" (1995) For Violin & Piano
- "PRAYER" (1994) For Viola & Piano (version for Violin & Piano, 1995)
- "MEDITATION" (1994) For Trombone & Piano
- "PASTORALE" (1992) For Flute & Harp (version for Flute & Piano)
- "MUSICA DOLOROSA No. 2" (1988) For Trombone Quartet
- Sonata for viola and piano (2012)
- SONATA FOR VIOLIN & PIANO (1980)
- PIANO TRIO (1976) For Violin, Violoncello and Piano
- STRING QUARTET (1974)

SOLO INSTRUMENT (Click here for detailed list)

- "NIGUN" Version for Violin Solo (1997)
- "NIGUN" Version for Viola Solo (2007)
- "JERUSALEM" For Piano (1991), Second Edition (2009)
- "VOICES OF JERUSALEM" (2004) For Guitar Solo
- "THE WANDERING STARS" (1996) For Harp Solo
- "THE LITTLE MERMAID" (1994) For Piano Solo
- "DAFNA" (1992) Poem For Piano
- SONATA FOR PIANO (1988)
- PIECE FOR VIBRAPHONE SOLO (1977)

SATB CHOIR A CAPELLA

- "THE 5th JEREMIAH’S LAMENTATION" (2001)
- "BY THE RIVERS OF BABYLON" (1991)
