= Phillip Rhodes =

Phillip Rhodes may refer to:

- Phillip Rhodes (drummer)
- Phillip Rhodes (baritone)

== See also ==
- Philip Rhodes, American naval architect
