= Jeffrey Grice =

- Birth name: Jeffrey Grice
- Born: 1954 (age 70–71); Christchurch, Canterbury, New Zealand

Pianist Jeffrey Grice was born in 1954 in Christchurch, New Zealand. In 1966, his family moved to Auckland where he attended Sacred Heart College in Glen Innes, counting among his classmates the future founding members of NZ's iconic rock band Split Enz. While studying languages (English, French and German) at Waikato University in Hamilton from 1971 to 1972, classical piano became his passion as he began to perform in lunchtime concerts on campus. Waikato University having no music faculty back in the 1970s, he auditioned in 1972 for the music department of the University of Auckland where, from 1973 to 1976, he studied with Janetta McStay and Bryan Sayer, graduating in French and Music. With a Queen Elizabeth Arts Council grant and a French Government scholarship, Grice left New Zealand in October 1976 to further his piano studies in Paris with Yvonne Loriod, obtaining the Licence de Concert at the Ecole Normale Supérieure de Musique in 1978 in the class of Germaine Mounier. Other formative influences came from intensive classes in Israel with Enrique Barenboim from 1979 to 1980, from the coaching of the American pianist and musicologist Charles Rosen and later from the French/Argentine pianist Florencia Raitzin-Legrand.

Resident in France for over forty years and a French citizen since 2005, a former laureate of the Yehudi Menuhin Foundation, the Cziffra Foundation and the Sophia-Antipolis Foundation, Jeffrey Grice performs regularly throughout Europe and abroad as a soloist, chamber musician and vocal accompanist. In 1984, he was awarded the Prix de l'Académie du disque français for his recording Le Tombeau de Ronsard with baritone Jacques Herbillon. In 1999, he was made an "Officier dans l'ordre des Arts et des Lettres" by the French government for services in the field of music.

He has premiered contemporary works by composers from New Zealand, Jenny McLeod (seven Tone Clock Pieces, in 1988), Lucien Johnson (To the sea, in 2007, Addis Nocturnes, in 2017) Nigel Keay (the dancer leads the procession, in 2007), France (Kirill Zaborov and David Chaillou), and Japan (Karen Tanaka).

He has recorded in Europe for Calliope, Erato, Integral Classic and Blümlein, in Japan for Sony Classical, Cosmo Village and JVC, and in New Zealand for Waiteata.
