= William Duke =

William Duke may refer to:

- William Duke (civil servant) (1863–1924), governor of Bengal
- William Duke (artist) (1814–1853), Irish-born Australian artist
- William Duke (mathematician) (born 1958), American mathematician
- William B. Duke (1857–1926), American Hall of Fame racehorse trainer
- William Mark Duke (1879–1971), Canadian archbishop
