= Mayor of Miramar =

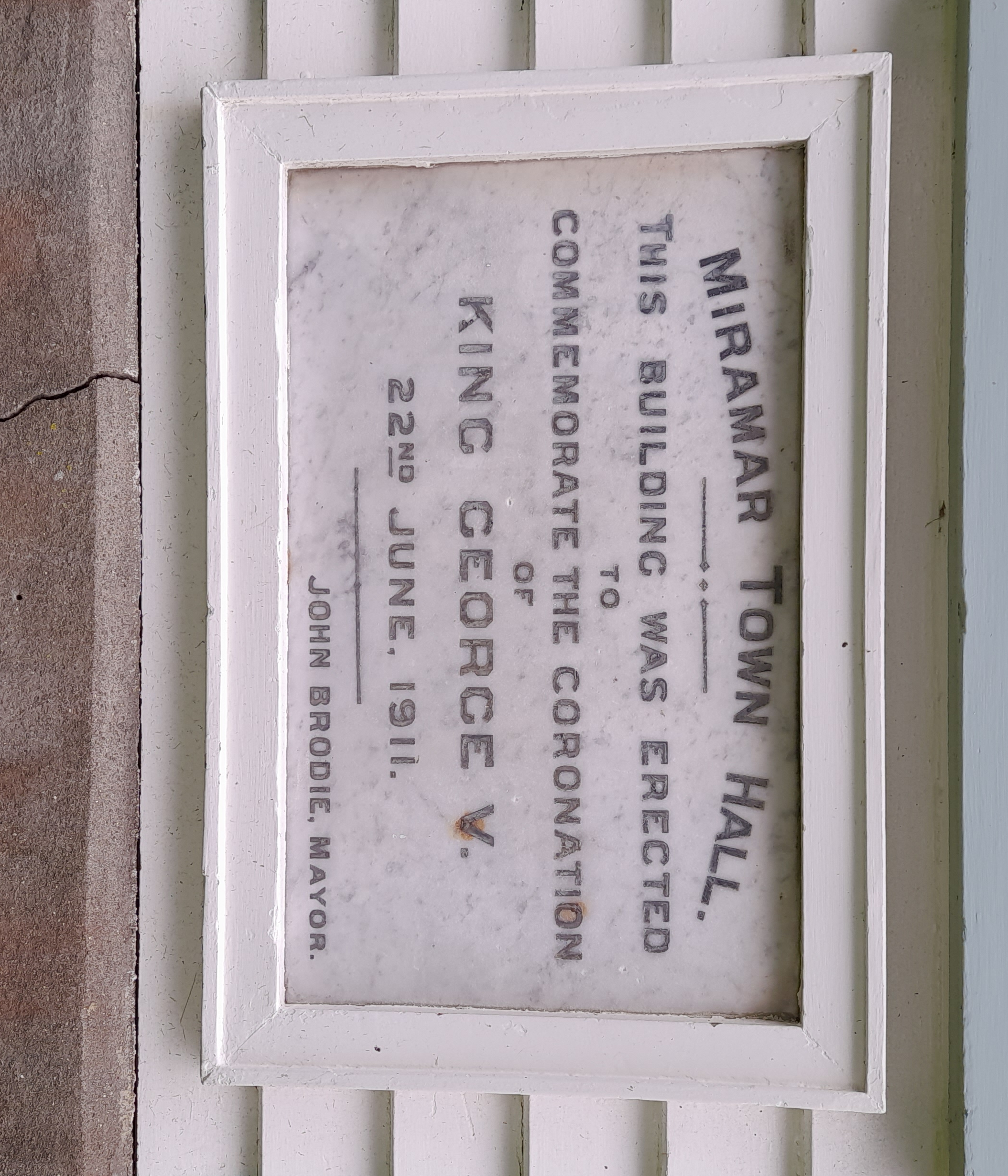
Foundation stone of the Miramar Town Hall, opened by mayor John Brodie in 1911

The mayor of Miramar officiated over the Miramar Borough of New Zealand, which was administered by the Miramar Borough Council. The office existed from 1904 until 1921, when Miramar Borough was amalgamated into Wellington City. There were five holders of the office.

== History ==
Miramar was initially part of the Makara Riding of Hutt County where it was originally known as Watt's Peninsula. It left Hutt County when it was constituted a borough on 10 November 1904, which granted an elected council and a mayor. The mayor was tasked with chairing council meetings and representing the borough on municipal matters. The most prominent issues mayors were tasked with for the duration of the borough's existence were electrification, sewage and the building and operation of tramways. The office of mayor ceased to exist when Miramar Borough amalgamated with Wellington City in 1921.

== List of mayors ==
Mayors of Miramar were:

	Name	Portrait	Term
1	Fred Townsend		1904–1907
2	Charles Crawford		1907–1910
3	John Brodie		1910–1912
4	Hector McLeod		1912–1913
(1)	Fred Townsend		1913–1919
5	Stanley Stone		1919–1921
