= New Zealand School of Music =

Conservatory in Wellington, New Zealand

Coordinates: 41.29136°S 174.76693°E

New Zealand School of Music / Te Kōkī
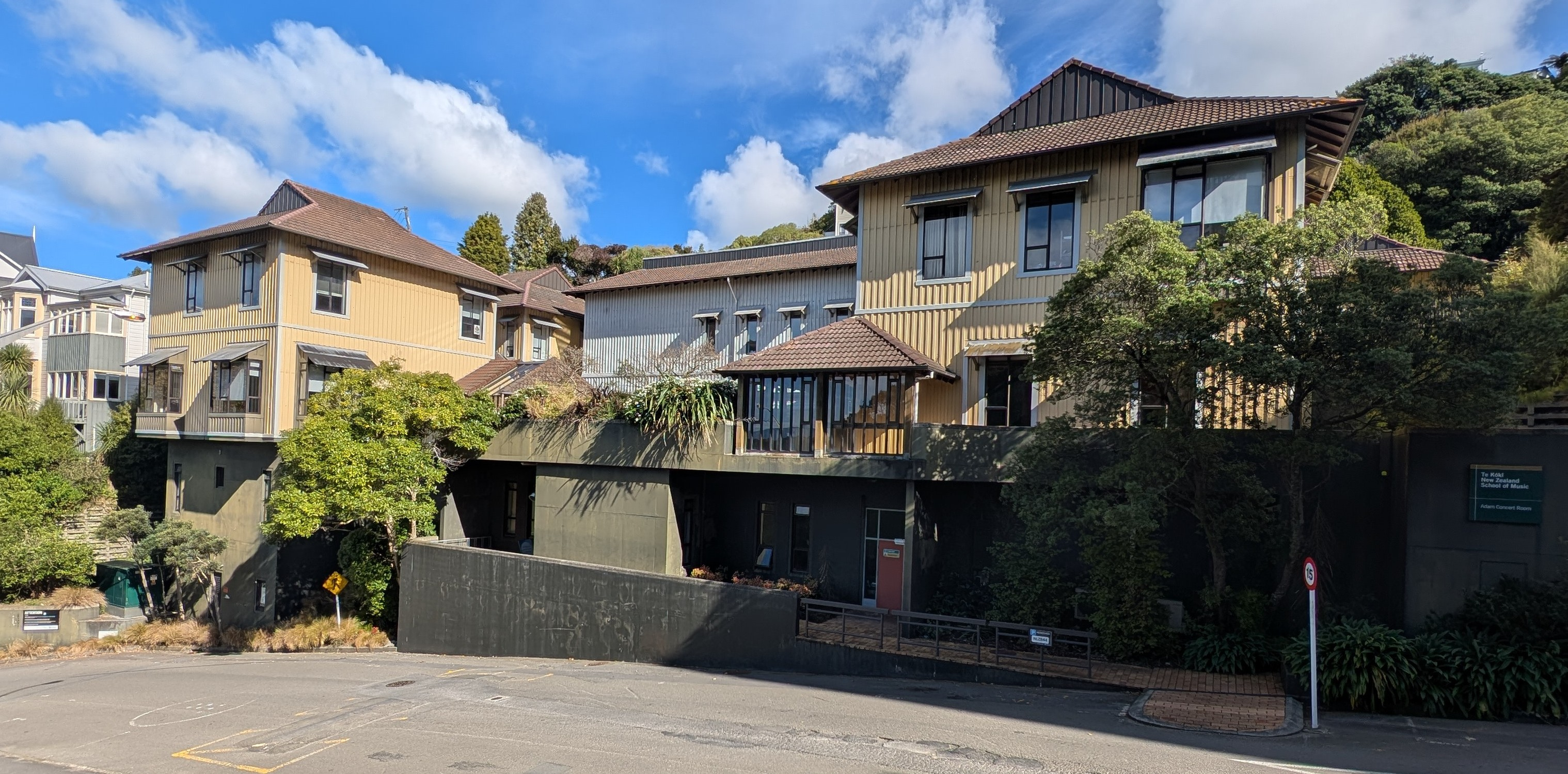
- Established: 2006; 20 years ago
- Affiliations: Victoria University of Wellington
- Head: Elizabeth Hudson (2006–2013); Euan Murdoch (2015–2017); Sally Jane Norman (2017–2024); Kim Cunio (2024–)
- Location: 88 Fairlie Terrace, Wellington, New Zealand
- Campus: Urban
- Website: www.wgtn.ac.nz/nzsm

The New Zealand School of Music—Te Kōkī (NZSM) at Victoria University of Wellington is located in Wellington, New Zealand. It provides a tertiary teaching faculty with programmes in classical and jazz performance, music studies, composition, and sonic arts. It also provides the only postgraduate degree course in music therapy available in the country, and runs the Wai-te-ata Music Press, which produces CDs and sheet music editions of New Zealand compositions.

== History ==
The school was originally established in 2006 as a joint venture between Victoria University of Wellington and Massey University. The te reo name Te Kōkī was chosen, which refers to the dawn chorus, New Zealand's unique birdsong contributed by many native species such as the tūī and korimako.

The NZSM combined the strengths of the former Conservatorium of Music at Massey, which specialised in jazz performance and commercial music production, and Victoria University's School of Music, which specialised in art music performance, composition, and research. Established as a limited liability company with the two universities as equal shareholders, it was governed by a board of directors and shared buildings on Massey's Wallace Street campus in Mount Cook, and Victoria's School of Music in Kelburn.

Professor Elizabeth Hudson was director of the NZSM from its launch until she stepped down in 2013. On 1 July 2014, the School transitioned to full ownership by Victoria University of Wellington, using the School of Music buildings on its Kelburn campus. Massey University retained and reorganised its former NZSM facilities into its School of Music and Screen Arts / Te Rewa o Puanga, offering courses in commercial and film music production. Euan Murdoch, Chief Executive of Chamber Music New Zealand, was appointed as the new director in 2015.

In 2017, Sally Jane Norman was appointed as director. Professor Kim Cunio, formerly head of the School of Music at the Australian National University, became head of NZSM in 2024.

With a full tertiary programme and full range of degrees, NZSM has strengths in historical research, allowing a representation of scholarly expertise across multiple fields including musicology, opera studies, jazz, ethnomusicology, music and film, baroque and classical performance practice, contemporary performance, music technology, and electronic music.

== Faculty and alumni ==
Notable faculty of the NZSM include New Zealand composer John Psathas, soprano Jenny Wollerman, violinist Martin Riseley, and music therapist Daphne Rickson, who completed the first PhD in music therapy in New Zealand through the NZSM. Former faculty members include composers Ross Harris and Kenneth Young, soprano Margaret Medlyn, and jazz musician and band leader Rodger Fox.

Notable alumni include composers Gareth Farr and Salina Fisher, members of the Drax Project, New Zealand Symphony Orchestra principal conductor Gemma New, and opera singers Simon O'Neill and Madeleine Pierard.
