= Elizabeth Hudson =

Professor of music in America and New Zealand

- Spouse(s): Stephan Prock, composer & musicologist (m. 1991)
- Children: 2

Academic background
- Thesis: Narrative in Verdi: perspectives on his musical dramaturgy (1993)

Academic work
- Institutions: University of Virginia, Victoria University of Wellington, Northeastern University
- Doctoral students: Margaret Medlyn

Elizabeth Hudson is an American musicologist, and is a Professor of Music and Dean of the College of Arts, Media and Design at Northeastern University, specialising in opera studies. She was previously director of the New Zealand School of Music.

== Academic career ==
Hudson was educated at the Manhattan School of Music and Smith College. She completed a Master of Arts and a PhD titled Narrative in Verdi: perspectives on his musical dramaturgy at Cornell University. Hudson was then director of undergraduate programmes in the University of Virginia's McIntire Department of Music.

Hudson was appointed to the faculty of Victoria University of Wellington in 2006, as professor of musicology. Hudson led the merger of the Massey University Conservatorium of Music and the Victoria University School of Music to create the New Zealand School of Music (NZSM), of which she was the inaugural director. During her time at the NZSM, Hudson developed the curriculum, a series of public performances, and collaborated with Luamanuvao Winnie Laban to appoint Samoan composer and performer Opeloge Ah Sam to teach Pasifika music and performance. One of Hudson's notable doctoral students is soprano Margaret Medlyn. Hudson stepped down from the directorship of NZSM in 2013, and took up a position as Dean of the College of Arts, Media and Design at Northeastern University.

Hudson specialises in opera studies, and has published on Donizetti, Puccini, as well as a critical edition of Verdi's Il Corsaro. Hudson has held a number of fellowships, including the Thomas Jefferson Visiting Fellowship at Downing College, Cambridge University, and a Lilly Teaching Fellowship. She was a founding editor of the Cambridge Opera Journal.

== Selected works ==
- Elizabeth Hudson (2011). "Moulin Rouge! and the Boundaries of Opera". The Opera Quarterly. 27 (2–3): 256–282. doi:10.1093/oq/kbr019. Wikidata Q124638143.
- Elizabeth Hudson (2002). "'… qualche cosa d'incredibile …': Hearing the invisible in Macbeth". Cambridge Opera Journal. 14 (1–2): 11–29. doi:10.1017/s0954586702000022. Wikidata Q124638144.
- Elizabeth Hudson (1992). "Gilda seduced: A tale untold". Cambridge Opera Journal. 4 (3): 229–251. doi:10.1017/s0954586700003785. Wikidata Q124638145.
- Verdi, Giuseppe, Il corsaro: melodramma tragico in tre atti, ed. Hudson, Elizabeth (Chicago: University of Chicago Press, 1999) ISBN 9788875924911 OCLC 53320512
