= Richard Fuchs =

German composer and architect (1887–1947)

- Born: 26 April 1887; Karlsruhe, Baden, Germany
- Died: 22 September 1947 (aged 60) Wellington, New Zealand
- Occupations: Composer, architect

Richard Fuchs (German: [ˈʁɪçaʁt ˈfʊks]; 26 April 1887 – 22 September 1947) was a German composer and architect, the older brother of German national team Olympic football player Gottfried Fuchs.

== Life ==
Fuchs was in the German Army, and was awarded the Iron Cross. He was active in the Jüdischer Kulturbund Baden and President of the B'nai B'rith Lodge in Karlsruhe in the 1930s. He designed the Gernsbach Synagogue - destroyed in Kristallnacht in 1938 - among other buildings, few of which survive.

After Kristallnacht he was in incarcerated at the age of 50, along with his brother Walter, on 1 November 1938 for some weeks in Dachau concentration camp. He was released when his application to emigrate to New Zealand was accepted, and he did so via England, arriving on 17 April 1939, bringing with him a selection of his compositions, listed below.

In Wellington he worked as an architect with Natusch and Sons, and the Housing Department while continuing to compose and taking an active part in the Wellington music scene. However, whereas in Germany he was persecuted as a Jew, in New Zealand, he was shunned as a German.

He wrote further chamber music, another string quartet and a piano quintet, songs, including A New Zealand Christmas to the words of Eileen Duggan, which was sung for the Queen during her 1953 visit to Rotorua by a Māori girls' choir, and in a Broadcast to Schools by T. J. ("Tommy") Young's children's choir.

== Legacy ==
Apart from some songs and a string quartet, few of Richard Fuchs’s compositions were performed in his lifetime. Now, he is virtually unknown, but there are moves to revive his work. In 2007, students of the Hochschule für Musik Karlsruhe performed some of the chamber music of Richard Fuchs at a special concert given in his memory.

In May 2008, the New Zealand Symphony Orchestra played a Symphonic Movement in F minor by Richard Fuchs composed in 1943. Chamber music that he wrote in New Zealand including Piano Quintet in D minor (1941) and String Quartet in E Major (1945), and his song, In "Der Fremde" (1937), were performed at a concert at Government House in 2008. His earlier chamber music, String Quartet in D minor (1932), was played in Auckland in 2009 together with some of his songs.

A film about the life of Richard Fuchs, The Third Richard (the first two being Wagner and Strauss) has been produced by his grandson Danny Mulheron.

Four of New Zealand's foremost singers, Richard Greager, Roger Wilson, Jenny Wollerman, and Margaret Medlyn, recorded a CD of songs by Richard Fuchs, In a Strange Land, accompanied by Richard Mapp and Bruce Greenfield in 2011.

His oratorio Vom Jüdischen Schicksal (Of Jewish Fate) was performed for the first time in September 2014 in Wellington at the "Recovering Forbidden Voices" conference. A recording of the Wellington performance is on the Forbidden Music blogsite. It was performed in his home town of Karlsruhe in January 2020.

On the 75th anniversary of his death on 22 September 2022, works by Richard Fuchs were performed in the Stadthalle in Gernsbach, namely the Piano Quintet in D minor (1941), the String Quartet in E major (1945) and the Kaddish (1935) in an arrangement for a string quartet.

(Biographical notes and compositions are in the manuscript collection of the Alexander Turnbull Library, Wellington, New Zealand: Fuchs, Richard (Dr), 1887-1947 Papers, MS-Group-0859)

== Works ==
- A Symphony for a large orchestra
- Music for eight wind instruments
- A piece for choir, four soloists and orchestra, Vom judischen Schicksal (Jewish Fate) set to poems by Karl Wolfskehl and Süsskind von Trimberg
- A String Quartet
- Songs for soprano and orchestra, Fruhling, set to text by Arno Holz
- A Piano Quintet
- Numerous songs to texts by Heine, Uhland, and many others
