= Borough of Onslow =

Coordinates: 41°14′59.99″S 174°46′23.98″E

- Borough of New Zealand
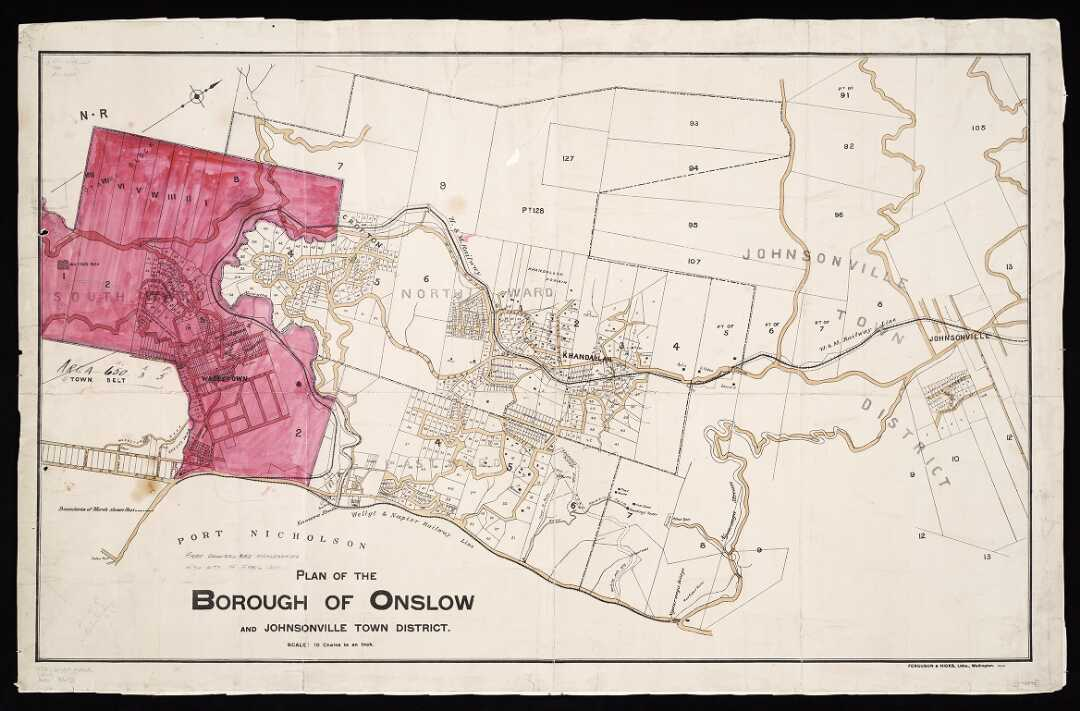
- Plan of the Borough of Onslow and Johnsonville Town District c. 1907 with Wadestown shaded red
- History
  - Established: 13 March 1890
  - Wadestown transferred to Wellington City: 17 April 1907
  - Disestablished: 1 April 1919
- Today part of: Wellington City

The Borough of Onslow was a local government district immediately to the north of Wellington, New Zealand. Incorporated on 13 March 1890 it included the districts of: Wadestown, Crofton, Khandallah and Kaiwarra but not Johnsonville. It replaced the Kaiwarra Town Board, the Wellington District Roads Board and a small part of the very wide jurisdiction of the Hutt County Council. Johnsonville Town Board remained independent.

Most of the population, in Wadestown, amalgamated with Wellington City in 1907, the rest in 1919.

== Maintaining Hutt County's roads ==
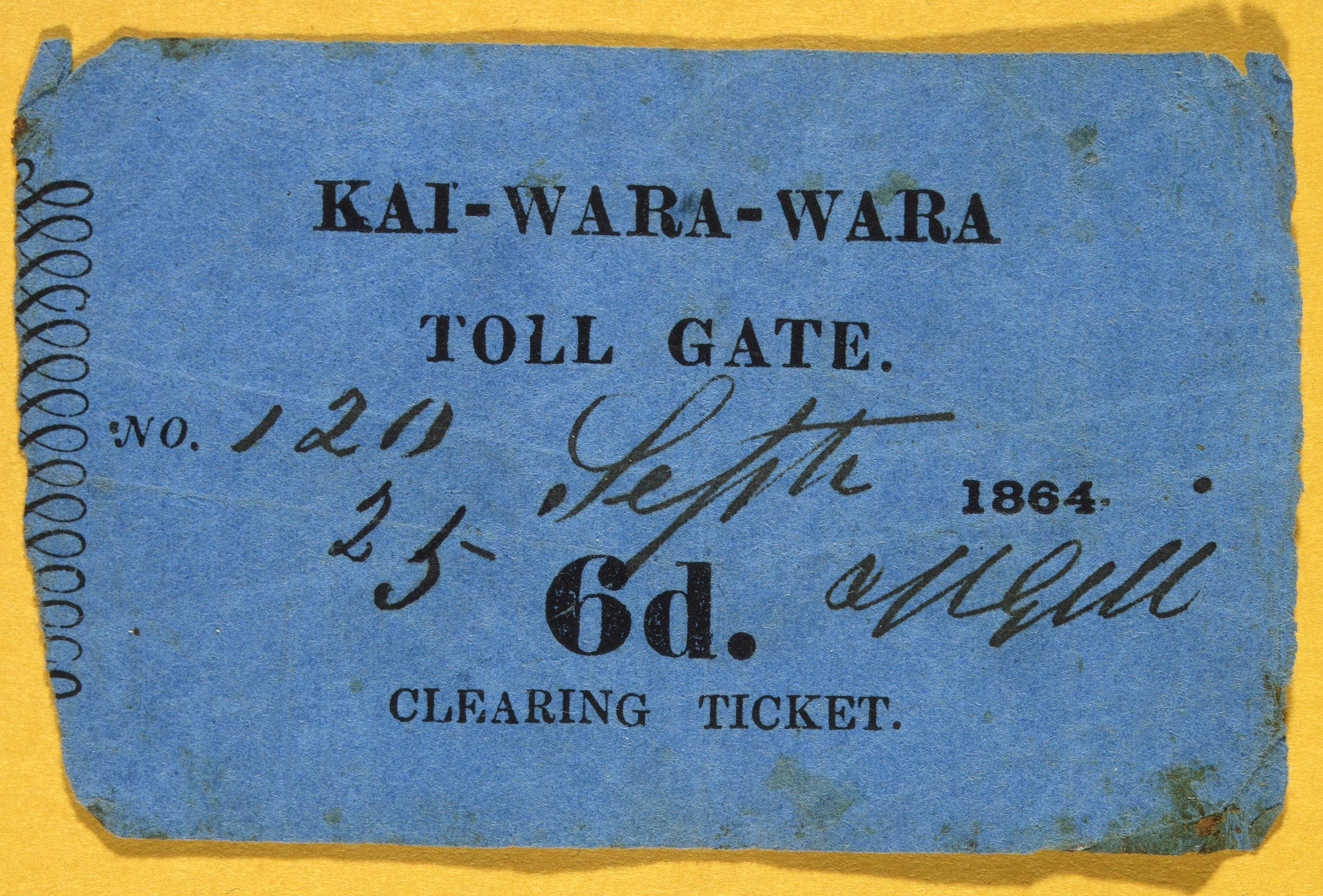
Proceeds of all tolls are for Hutt County Council

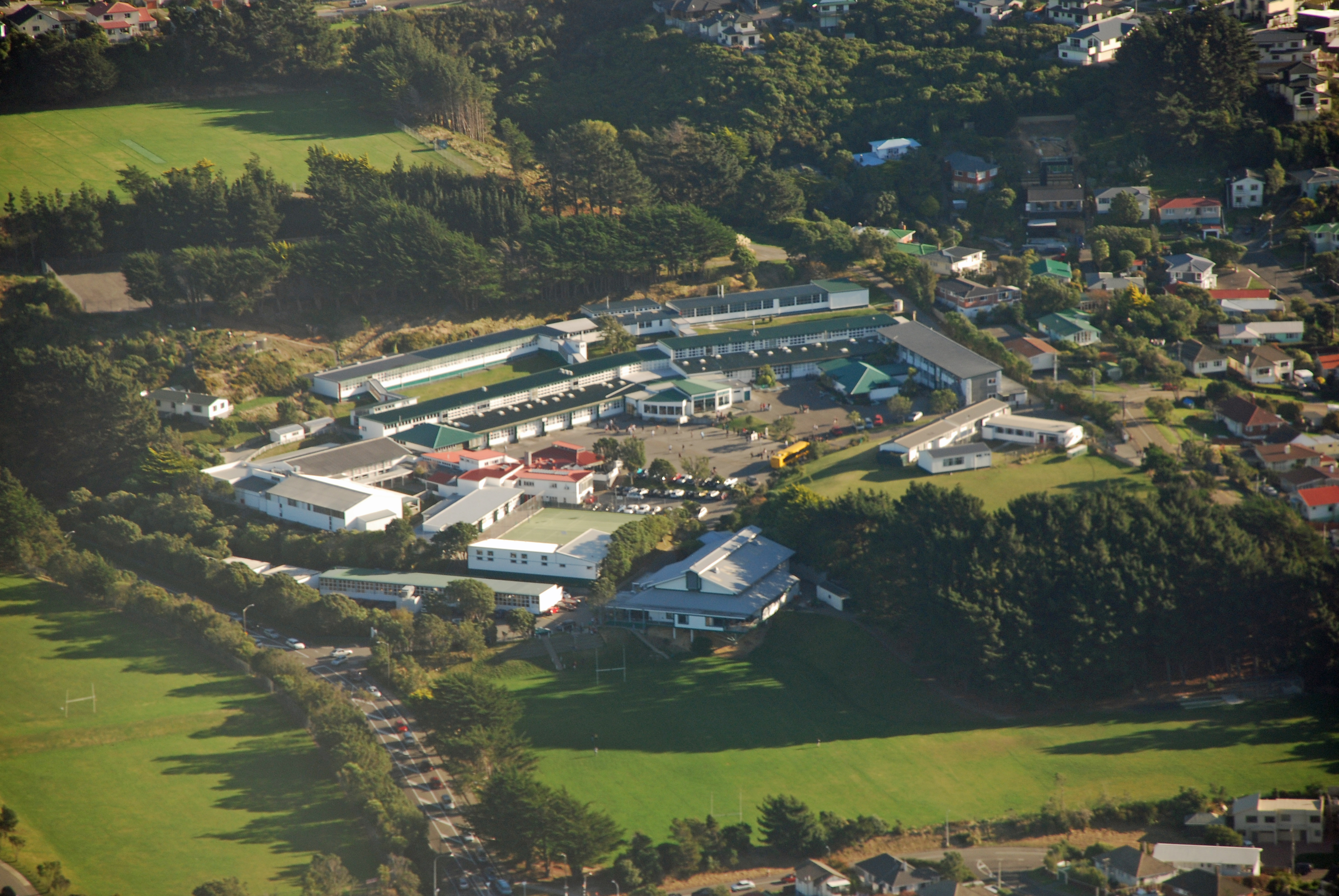
Onslow College 2007

A major incentive in the formation of the new borough was Hutt County Council's Kaiwarra toll gate set up where traffic moved between Wellington and Hutt County. Hutt County had imposed a tax on all traffic entering Wellington and their toll gate was on part of the proposed new borough's district. If the new Borough of Onslow were approved there could be no more tolls collected there by Hutt County.

Once the new borough was approved Hutt County did erect replacement toll gates in the Ngauranga Gorge and on the Hutt Road but these placements did not affect local Onslow and Wellington traffic to the same extent.

The new Borough of Onslow council rented out the old toll-collector's house.

== Name ==
Onslow Brass Band formed 1905 changed its name to Wellington Brass Band in 1998.

Onslow College opened in 1956 to provide a secondary school for the district.

Onslow Cricket Club

Parish of Onslow

Onslow Road remains the principal access to Khandallah from the harbourside.

The Earl of Onslow was Governor of New Zealand from 1889 to 1892. His name came from a township in the parish of Shrewsbury St. Chad, Shropshire.

== Merging ==
The difficulties of building adequate drainage for Wadestown within Onslow's boundaries, the subdivision of the Highland Park estate and the appeal to the residents of this very steep area of joining Wellington's tramway system led to Wadestown's amalgamation with Wellington City in April 1907.

The rest of Onslow Borough, at their persistent request, was amalgamated with Wellington City on 1 April 1919.
