= Helen Medlyn =

New Zealand opera singer (born 1958)

Helen Medlyn MNZM
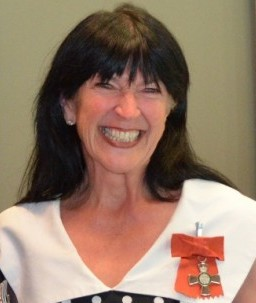
- Medlyn in 2014
- Born: 1958 (age 67–68); Falmouth, Cornwall, England
- Occupations: Opera singer (mezzo-soprano); actor; producer
- Years active: 1982–2016
- Relatives: Margaret Medlyn (sister)

Helen Medlyn MNZM (born 1958) is a New Zealand mezzo-soprano opera singer, musical theatre actor, media producer and gardener. She is particularly known for her comic roles and for her cabaret performances.

== Early life and family ==
Medlyn was born in Falmouth in 1958. Her family moved to New Zealand when she was three, and she grew up in Henderson Valley. Her mother was a director, actor and singer in musical theatre and her father was a butcher. Her older sister, Margaret Medlyn, is also a well-known opera singer (with a soprano vocal range).

== Education ==
From 1964 to 1970 she attended Oratia District School, and was head girl in her final year. Her first performing role was as one of the Three Kings in a school Nativity play. She subsequently attended Henderson High School.

== Career ==
Medlyn began her stage career in 1982 as a dancer in the chorus of the New Zealand touring production of Evita. She continued performing in musical theatre during the 1980s, performing major roles in productions at the Mercury Theatre, Centrepoint Theatre and other venues, while working as a media producer at Saatchi & Saatchi. She became a full-time performer in 1989. In 1992 she began her opera career, after tutoring by Janice Webb. That same year she won The New Zealand Herald Aria Award.

Medlyn tended to perform comic or character roles, in part due to her vocal range as a mezzo-soprano. Roles played by Medlyn over the years include Madame Flora in The Medium, Marcellina in The Marriage of Figaro, Dame Quickly in Falstaff, Prince Orlovsky in Die Fledermaus, Concepción in L'heure espagnole, Brangaene in Tristan und Isolde and Fräulein Schneider in Cabaret. She performed regularly with the New Zealand Symphony Orchestra. She also acted in plays including performing the roles of Joy Gresham in Shadowlands for the Mercury Theatre and Mrs Parker in the play Daughters of Heaven with the Auckland Theatre Company. In 2003 she performed "Alice", a cantata that was written for her by Gillian Whitehead, with the Auckland Philharmonia Orchestra, and in 2012 she performed it again with the New Zealand Symphony Orchestra. In 2017 she starred as Katisha in a national tour of The Mikado, and as Mother Superior in Sister Act in Auckland.

Beginning in the 1980s, Medlyn collaborated with musical director and pianist Penny Dodd in a number of concerts and performances, including notably eight critically-acclaimed cabaret shows themed around the concept of hell between 2000 and 2010. In their 2007 show, Hell Man, Medlyn performed songs written for men. In 2013 they performed a touring production, Hell on Wheels.

In 2002, Medlyn was made an Arts Foundation Laureate. In the 2013 Queen's Birthday Honours, she was appointed a Member of the New Zealand Order of Merit, for services to the performing arts. She was described by The New Zealand Herald critic William Dart as "one of our finest mezzos".

In 2018, Medlyn retired from singing due to arthritis in her jaw and became a full-time gardener. She also wrote a weekly column for the travel section of New Zealand website Stuff in 2018 and 2019.
