= Sally Jane Norman =

New Zealand performing arts historian

Sally Jane Norman FRSA

Academic background
- Education: University of Canterbury, Institut d'études théâtrales de Paris, Institut d'études théâtrales de Paris
- Thesis: La Mise en scène du corps: vers une nouvelle plastique scénique, 1900-1930 (1990)
- Doctoral advisor: Bernard Dort, Denis Bablet

Academic work
- Institutions: Victoria University of Wellington

Sally Jane Norman is a New Zealand–French performing arts historian, who is currently the inaugural incumbent of the Denis Adam Chair in Music at Victoria University of Wellington, having served as Director of the New Zealand School of Music from July 2017 until April 2024. Norman is a Fellow of the Royal Society of the Arts, and the National Academy of Chinese Theatre Arts. Her research on performance technologies builds on historical forms and extends to contemporary practices involving digital tools and techniques.

== Academic career ==
Norman gained Bachelor of Arts and Master of Arts degrees at the University of Canterbury. She then attended the University of Paris 3, where she completed a Doctorat de 3ème cycle (1980) and Doctorat D’Etat (1990) from the Institut D’Etudes Théâtrales; her second thesis on avant-garde performance and embodiment is titled La Mise en scène du corps: vers une nouvelle plastique scénique, 1900-1930. Norman was Director General of the Ecole européenne supérieure de l’image, and then the inaugural Director of the Culture Lab at Newcastle University. Norman then joined the faculty of the University of Sussex, where she was Professor of Performance Technologies, and co-founding co-director of the Sussex Humanities Lab. In 2017 Norman was appointed the Director of the New Zealand School of Music, and since April 2024 is the Denis Adam Chair in Music at Victoria University of Wellington.

Norman is a New Zealander, and grew up in Tītahi Bay. She publishes in French and English, as a dual citizen of France and New Zealand.

== Honours and awards ==
Norman is a Fellow of the Royal Society of the Arts, and the National Academy of Chinese Theatre Arts.

== Selected works ==
- Sally-Jane Norman (16 June 2014), Grappling With Movement Models: Performing Arts And Slippery Contexts, Association for Computing Machinery, doi:10.1145/2617995.2618019, Wikidata Q126367487
- Sally Jane Norman (2013). "Contexts of/as Resistance". Contemporary Music Review. 32 (2–03): 275–288. doi:10.1080/07494467.2013.775805. Wikidata Q126367508.
- Bennett Hogg; Sally Jane Norman (2013). "Resistant Materials in Musical Creativity". Contemporary Music Review. 32 (2–03): 115–118. doi:10.1080/07494467.2013.775804. Wikidata Q126367509.
- Kirk Woolford; Blackwell, Alan; Sally Jane Norman; Cecile Chevalier (2010). "Crafting a Critical Technical Practice". Leonardo. 43 (2): 202–203. doi:10.1162/leon.2010.43.2.202. Wikidata Q126367510.
- Sally Jane Norman (2006). "Instant conductors". International Journal of Performance Arts and Digital Media. 2 (2): 109–121. doi:10.1386/padm.2.2.109_1. Wikidata Q126367511.
- Sally Jane Norman (2015). "Theater and ALife Art: Modeling Open and Closed Systems". Artificial Life. 21 (3): 344–353. doi:10.1162/artl_a_00175. PMID 26280075. Wikidata Q47658490.
- Sally Jane Norman (2016). "Setting live coding performance in wider historical contexts". International Journal of Performance Arts and Digital Media. 12 (2): 117–128. doi:10.1080/14794713.2016.1227600. Wikidata Q126367483.
- Sally-Jane Norman (2016). "Mothers of Invention: An Afterword". Contemporary Music Review. 35 (1): 150–160. doi:10.1080/07494467.2016.1176770. Wikidata Q126367484.
