= Wellington Opera =

Opera company in Wellington, New Zealand

- The Wellington Opera Trust
- Formation: 2020
- Type: Opera company
- Location: Wellington, New Zealand
- Chair: Dame Kerry Prendergast
- Artistic Director: Matthew Ross
- Website: Official website

Wellington Opera is an opera company based in Wellington, New Zealand formed in 2020 by the Wellington Opera Trust, a charitable organisation, with funding and support from Creative New Zealand, Wellington City Council and the Kiri Te Kanawa Foundation.

== History ==
The company's first staging was a production of Mozart's Don Giovanni in Wellington's Opera House directed by Sara Brodie, in April 2021. The cast included New Zealand-born bass-baritone James Ioelu, Christian Thurston, and Amelia Berry, accompanied by Orchestra Wellington conducted by artistic director Matthew Ross. The performances were well attended and received positive reviews.

The 2022 production of Verdi's La traviata reopened Wellington's largest theatre, the St James Theatre, after it was closed in 2018 for earthquake strengthening work after the 2016 Kaikōura earthquake. The opening night performance was somewhat hampered by COVID-19 infections among the cast and crew, but was nonetheless received positively by the audience and reviewers.

In 2023 it staged Lucia di Lammermoor by Donizetti. In 2024 there were performances of Tosca by Puccini, and in 2025 the choice was Un Ballo in Maschera by Verdi.
