= William Duke (artist) =

William Charles Duke
- Born: 1815; Cork, Ireland
- Died: 17 October 1853 (aged 37–38); Collingwood, Victoria
- Known for: Portraiture, Landscapes
- Spouse: Lucy

William Charles Duke (1814 – 17 October 1853) was an Irish-born Australian artist remembered primarily for his portraits of several Māori leaders, and as a "journeyman painter of lively marine oil paintings of whaling, commissioned by Hobart shipowners".

== Biography ==
William Charles Duke was born in Cork, to Catherine, wife of carpenter Charles Duke. He was baptised on 16 July 1815 in the Church of St Anne, Shandon, and followed his father into carpentry.

Duke married dressmaker Lucy on 16 February 1840, and together they undertook assisted migration to Australia, arriving in Sydney with their son Charles, born on the voyage, aboard the Lady McNaughton on 16 December 1840; Charles died in Sydney on 2 December 1841, aged 1 year.

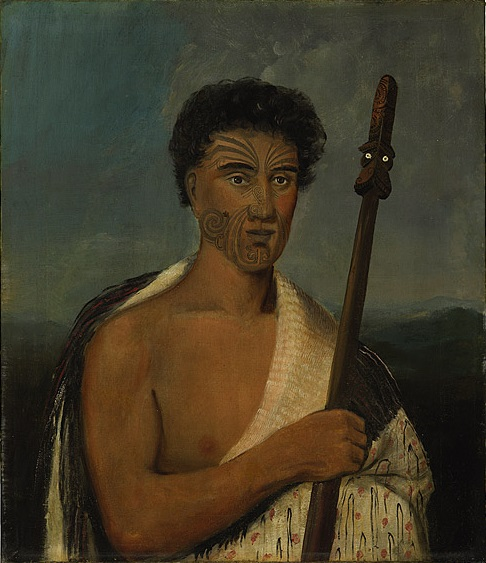
William Duke. Portrait of Hohepa Te Umuroa. 1846. Canberra, National Gallery of Australia.

Duke worked as a scene-painter and mechanist at Sydney’s Royal Victoria Theatre until 1844, when he spent several months in New Zealand. When he returned to Australia it was to Hobart, where he landed on 7 May 1845 aboard the Sir John Franklin. Lucy and their now two children joined him from Sydney in September, by which time he was established as a scene-painter at the Hobart Town Royal Victoria Theatre in Campbell Street.

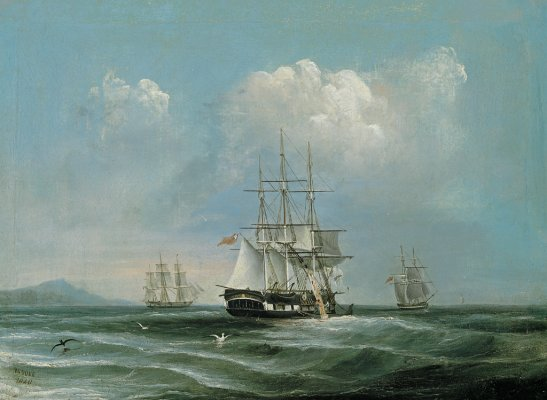
William Duke, The Hobart whaling vessel Pacific, 1848. Art Gallery of South Australia.

In Tasmania, Duke first began to work as a portrait painter; his earliest painting is a portrait believed to be of Mrs Wilkinson, née Eldridge, signed and dated October 1845. Hobart was a major whaling port and he produced a series paintings of whaling ships and whaling scenes. In 1846, Duke produced some of the earliest painted depictions of individual Māori when he finished two small portraits apparently begun in New Zealand, and undertook a larger-scale portrait of one of the Māori men transported for imprisonment in Tasmania's Maria Island in November 1846, during the early New Zealand wars.

== Commercial work ==
Duke worked with mechanist Richard Johnson on two moving, circular cityscape dioramas (views of Constantinople, Florence, Jerusalem and Venice) which were exhibited in Sydney and Hobart in 1847 to paying audiences. At the same time, he came to local notoriety with the publication of four paintings of local whaling operations, and began to take commissions to produce paintings of ships to be used in advertising.

In 1852, Duke followed the lure of the Victorian gold rush, relocating with his growing family to country Victoria, where he continued portrait painting and theatre work.

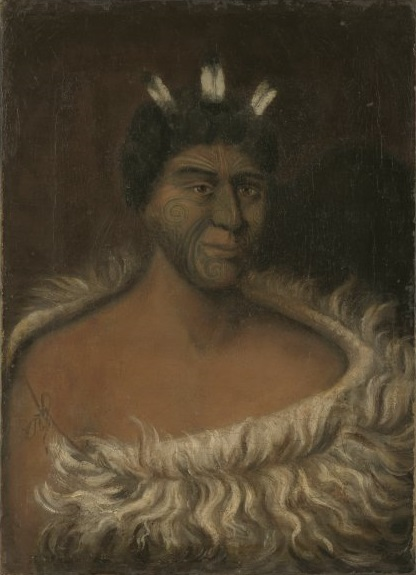
William Duke. The Celebrated Chief Hone Heke. 1846. Canberra, National Library of Australia.

Duke's last commission was for Joseph Andrew Rowe, an American circus owner who spent two years touring in and around Melbourne from 1852. Rowe had commissioned paintings and decorations from Duke for his American Circus and Duke was into his fourth week of work when he became ill and went home. Duke's condition deteriorated and he died a week later, leaving his wife and children destitute. The generous Mr Rowe initiated a 'subscription-paper' contributing ten pound to the fund. During the course of one day at the Circus, his fund raised a respectable sum of money for the widow and her children.

Duke died of what was recorded as inflammation of the lungs in Collingwood, Victoria at the age of 38, leaving Lucy and six children.

== Works ==
- "The Celebrated Chief Hone or John Heke", "Portrait of Mekatu" (begun 1844)
- "Portrait of Hohepa Te Umuroa" (1846)
- "The Flurry" (image), "The Chase", "The Rounding" and "The Cutting In" (whaling series, 1848)
- "New Town Road, Hobart Town" (c 1850)
- "Geelong from Mr Hiatt’s, Burrabool Hills" (1851)
- "Offshore Whaling with the 'Aladdin' and 'Jane'" (1849)
- "Mrs Wilkingson, nee Eldridge" (1845)
- "Figure head of the barque Derwent" (1849)
- "Mr C. Young" (1853)
