= Hutt County =

Former county of New Zealand

- County of New Zealand
- 1876–1989
- Capital: Initially Wellington, later Wainuiomata
- Area
  - Coordinates: 41°15′41″S 174°57′3″E
- History
  - Established: 1876
  - Disestablished: 1989
- Today part of: Kāpiti Coast, Porirua, Upper Hutt, Lower Hutt, Wellington, all parts of Greater Wellington.

Hutt County was one of the former counties of New Zealand. It occupied the south-western corner of the North Island, extending south from the Waikanae River and lying to the west of the summits of the Rimutaka Ranges. The county's name arose from the fact that a large amount of its land area lay in the Hutt River catchment.

The county initially had 8 ridings: Belmont, Epuni, Horokiwi, Makara, Mungaroa, Porirua, Wainui-o-mata and Whareroa. By 1895, each riding elected one councillor, except Porirua, which elected two, to the Hutt County Council. One of the elected councillors was appointed as chairman of the council.

Hutt County was administered by the Hutt County Council, which was first established in 1876, but it was eventually dissolved in 1989 when local government was reformed and the few remaining constituent ridings were amalgamated into adjacent cities. Between 1908 and 1962 the Makara Riding was separately administered as Makara County.

During its time, several towns, boroughs, districts, and eventually cities developed within the county. While the town of Wellington was already a separately incorporated local body at the time the county was established, its jurisdiction did not then extend beyond the town belt on the hills around Lambton Harbour. The boroughs of Melrose, Onslow, Karori, Miramar, Johnsonville and Tawa Flat initially developed in parts of Hutt County just outside Wellington. Those boroughs were eventually incorporated into Wellington city, as the county that had been the Makara Riding later was, after Porirua became a borough in 1961 and a city in 1965.

In the Hutt Valley towns developed into boroughs at Eastbourne, Petone, Lower Hutt and Upper Hutt, with the latter two eventually becoming cities. As these urban areas developed and grew, the urbanised areas of Hutt County were incorporated into these cities and boroughs. Despite this, significant communities also developed in Stokes Valley north-east of Lower Hutt, the Wainuiomata valley east of Lower Hutt, and Heretaunga–Pinehaven in the southern part of the Upper Hutt basin.

Small coastal communities on the Kāpiti Coast were established early on, though major development around Paraparaumu and Waikanae was not significant until the 1970s and 1980s after land closer to Wellington had been developed.

By 1989, Hutt County had become so fragmented that the only reasonable reform (as part of the abolition of all mainland counties) was to incorporate the various remaining communities into adjoining cities.

== See also ==
- List of former territorial authorities in New Zealand § Counties
