= Orpheus Choir of Wellington =

Choir in Wellington, New Zealand

- Choir
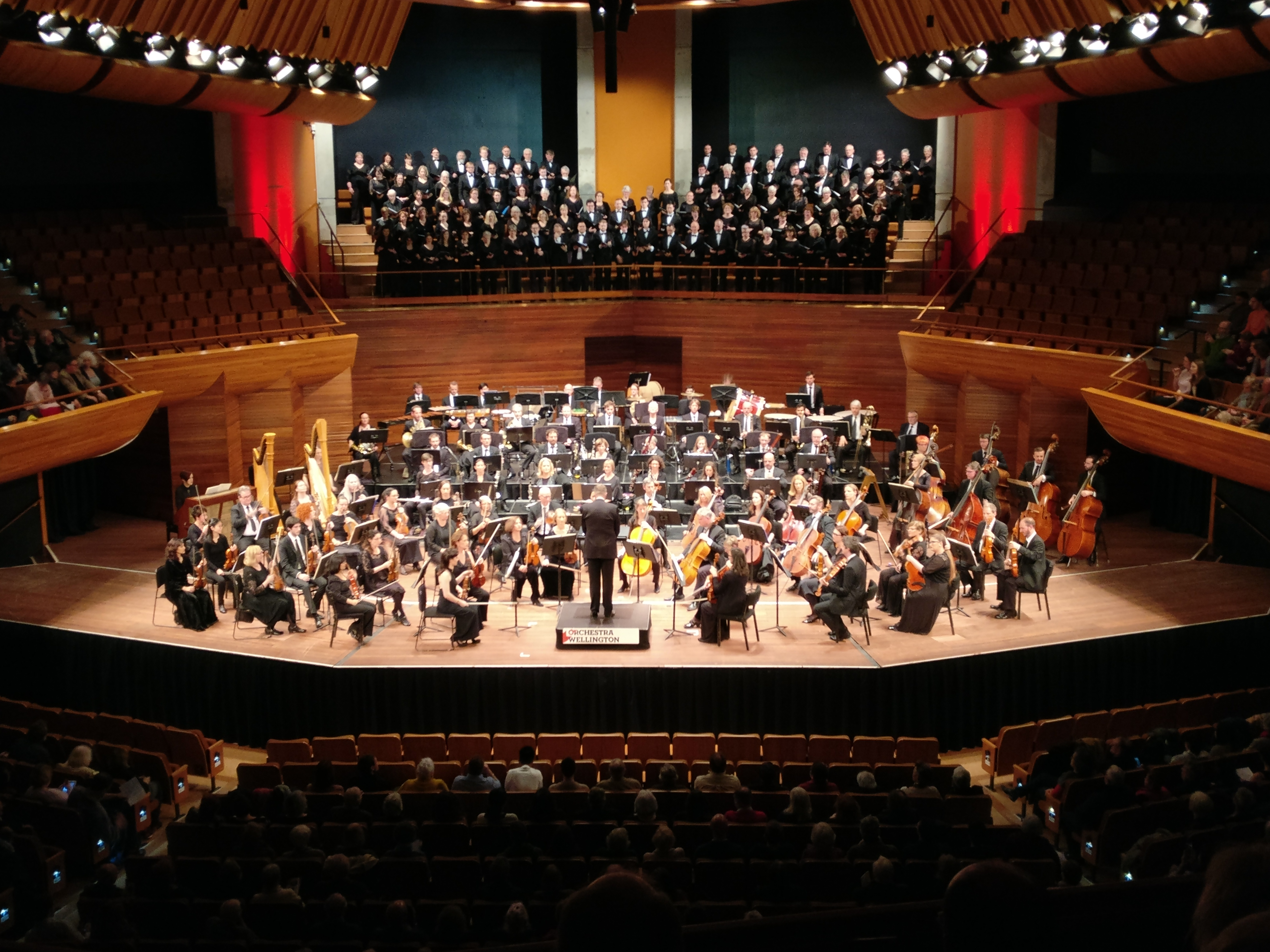
- Performing with Orchestra Wellington, August 2017
- Former name: Hutt Valley Orpheus Society
- Founded: 1950s
- Music director: Brent Stewart (2014–)
- Headquarters: Wellington, New Zealand
- Rehearsal space: Te Whaea
- Affiliation: New Zealand Choral Federation
- Associated groups: New Zealand Symphony Orchestra; Orchestra Wellington
- Website: orpheuschoir.org.nz

The Orpheus Choir of Wellington is an auditioned mixed-voice symphonic choir based in Wellington, New Zealand. It has over 150 members and regularly performs with the New Zealand Symphony Orchestra and Orchestra Wellington.

== History ==
The Hutt Valley Musical Society was established in 1947, and the Hutt Valley Orpheus Society choir emerged from it a few years later. Its first conductors were Horace Hunt and Len Schwabe, then Malcolm Rickard.

By 1958 the choir was performing in large choral works with the National Orchestra (now the New Zealand Symphony Orchestra) conducted by John Hopkins, such as the Mahler Resurrection Symphony, the Verdi Requiem, and Beethoven's Ninth Symphony in 1967.

In 1983 Peter Godfrey became the musical director upon Malcolm Rickard's retirement.

The current musical director is Brent Stewart, appointed in 2014. Margaret Medlyn and Suzanne Snively are Vice Patrons of the choir.

== Bibliography ==
- Thomson, John M. (1991). The Oxford History of New Zealand Music. Oxford: Oxford University Press. ISBN 0-19-558176-8. OCLC 26724223. OL 1618054M. Wikidata Q115122586.
