= Marc Taddei =

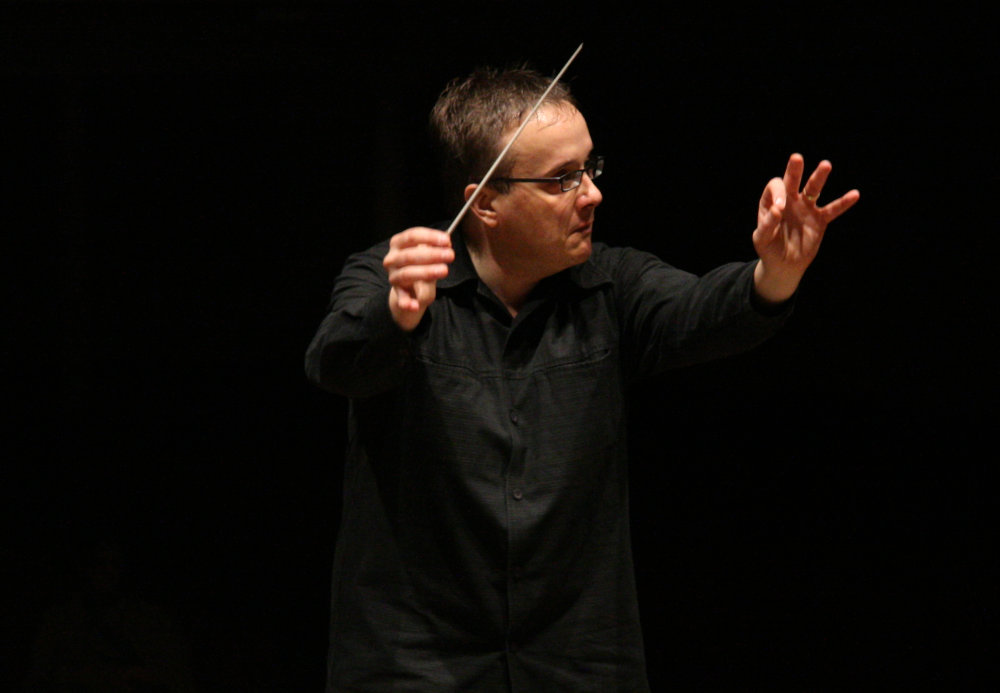
- Marc Taddei conducting Orchestra Wellington, 2007

Background information
- Occupation: conductor

Marc Taddei is a conductor based in New Zealand. He is the music director of both Orchestra Wellington in New Zealand since 2007, and San Francisco-based Vallejo Symphony Orchestra since 2016. He is a frequent guest conductor with orchestras throughout New Zealand, Australia, and the United States, and as a recording artist has worked in cinema and television productions, and produced many commercial classical music recordings.

== Biography ==
Originally from the United States, Taddei graduated from Juilliard School in Manhattan and emigrated to New Zealand in the 1980s to take up the position of principal trombonist with the New Zealand Symphony Orchestra, before pursuing full-time conducting in 2002.

Taddei is a vocal advocate for the performing arts in New Zealand, and has premièred performances of many New Zealand works. He has established a Composer-in-Residence programme with Orchestra Wellington to foster local artists.

== Awards ==
The View From Olympus album, featuring music by New Zealand composer John Psathas, was awarded Classical Album of the Year at the 2007 Vodafone New Zealand Music Awards. It remained at #1 in the classical music charts for 9 months and featured on US critic Jim Svejda's syndicated KUSC radio programme, The Record Shelf.
