= Jenny McLeod =

New Zealand composer (1941–2022)

Jenny McLeod ONZM
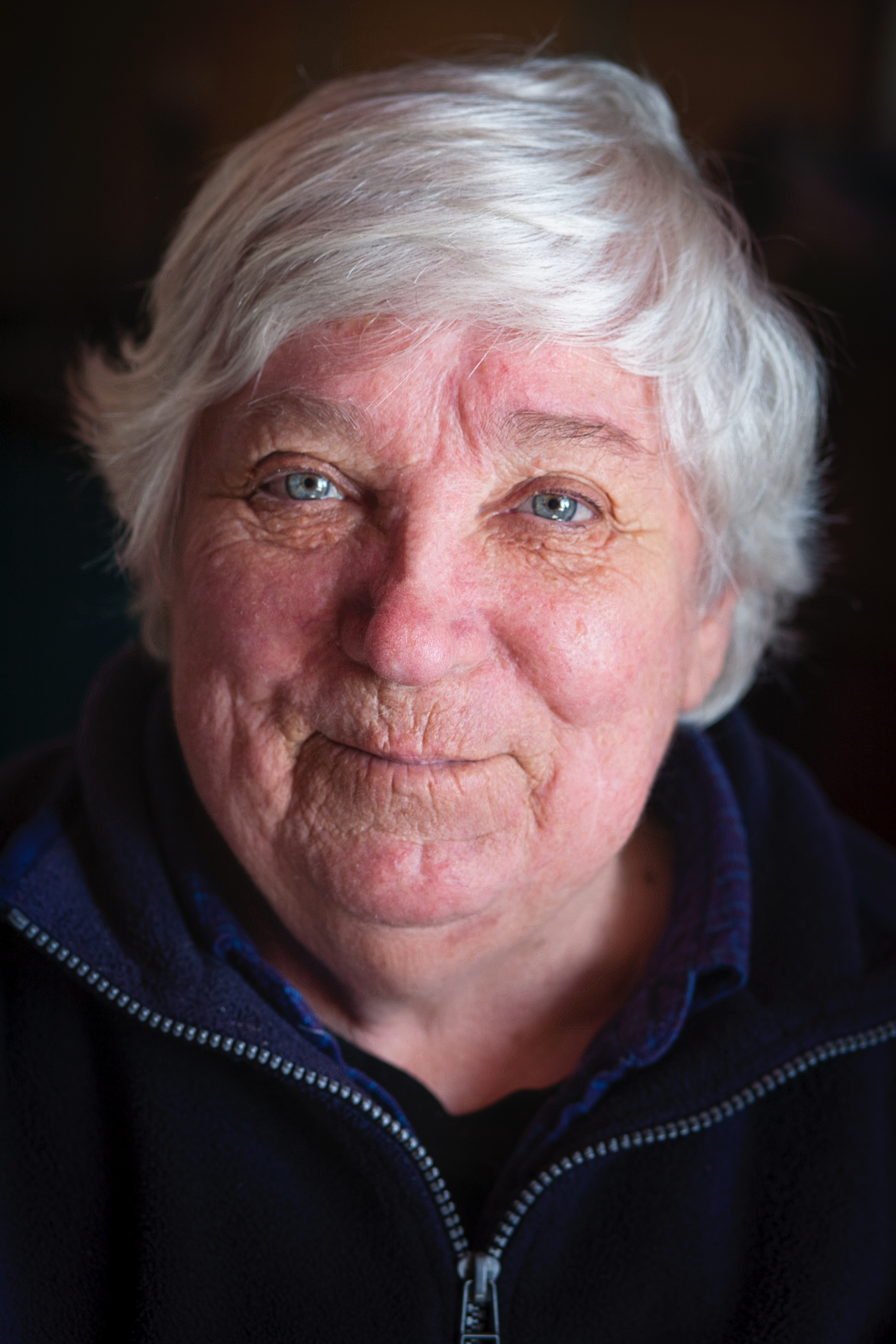
- McLeod in 2009
- Born: 12 November 1941; Wellington, New Zealand
- Died: 28 November 2022 (aged 81); Palmerston North, New Zealand
- Education: Victoria University of Wellington
- Occupation: Composer
- Writing career
- Notable works: Earth and Sky (1968); Under the Sun (1971); The Emperor and the Nightingale (1986); Hōhepa (2012)

Jennifer Helen McLeod ONZM (12 November 1941 – 28 November 2022) was a New Zealand composer and professor of music at Victoria University of Wellington. She composed several major works for big groups including Under the Sun for four orchestras and 450 children, and the opera Hōhepa.

== Biography ==
McLeod was born in Wellington on 12 November 1941, the daughter of Lorna Bell McLeod (née Perrin) and Ronald D'Arcy McLeod, and grew up in Timaru and Levin. She was musical as a child and could read music at age five. In 1961, McLeod began studying music at Victoria University of Wellington, where her teachers included Frederick Page, David Farquhar and Douglas Lilburn, and graduated with a Bachelor of Music degree in 1964.

In 1964 a New Zealand government bursary enabled her to study for two years in Europe with Messiaen, Stockhausen and Berio. In 1967 she became a lecturer in music at Victoria University. She was appointed at a young age to Professor in 1971, a position she held until 1976. During her professorship, she was influenced by Guru Maharaji's Divine Light Mission, which led to her early retirement.

In the 1997 Queen's Birthday Honours, McLeod was appointed an Officer of the New Zealand Order of Merit, for services to music.

McLeod is best known for two major works, Earth and Sky and Under the Sun for large forces. She also composed many songs and hymns. She was a great admirer of, and was greatly influenced by, the music of Messiaen. Her Seven Tone Clock Pieces were first performed by the New Zealand pianist Jeffrey Grice.

Before her death in Palmerston North on 28 November 2022, at the age of 81, McLeod lived in Pukerua Bay, working on music theory, especially the relationships between notes and scales.

== Tone-Clock Theory ==
In the mid-1980s, McLeod encountered the work of Dutch composer Peter Schat, who had developed a post-tonal compositional technique called the Tone Clock. This technique emphasised forming the chromatic aggregate through the transposition and inversion of three-note pitch collections (trichords). McLeod expanded this technique to encompass all 223 possible set-classes (to use the terminology of Allan Forte's pitch-class set theory), and also developed a coherent labelling, categorisation and analytical approach to the universe of chromatic possibilities. Her unpublished manuscript Tone Clock Theory Expanded: Chromatic Maps I & II explains the theoretical and philosophical basis behind her theory, and includes a rigorous listing of all set-classes (called Intervallic Prime Forms) with detailed notes and observations on their properties.

== Major works ==
Selected compositions:

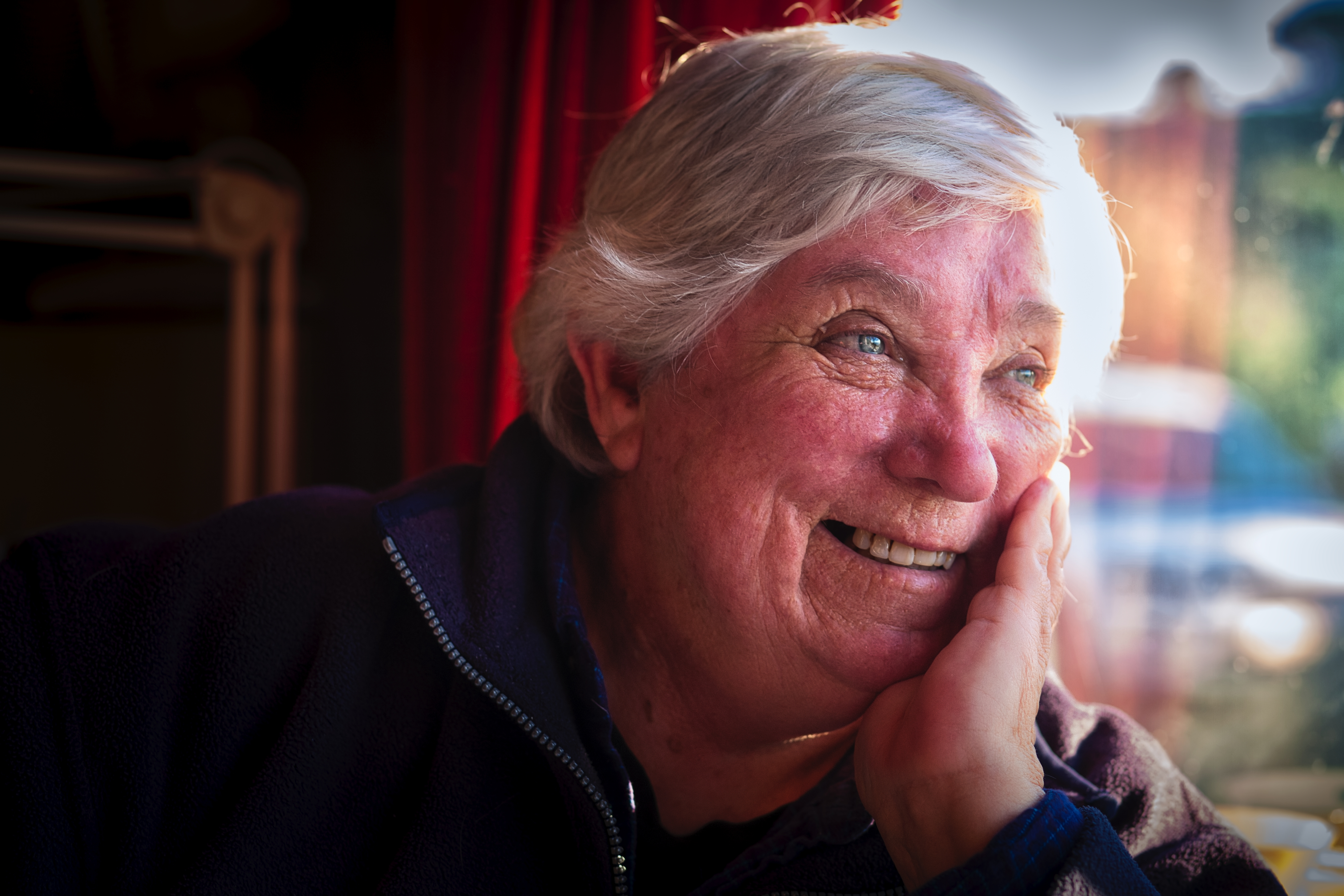
Jenny McLeod at home in Pukerua Bay, 2009

=== Earth and Sky ===
Earth and Sky is a large work for choirs and orchestra, mainly of children. It tells the story of the Māori myth of creation, notably the separation of the Earth Mother, Papa-Tū-ā-Nuku from the Sky Father, Ranginui. It uses many passages involving voices moving independently. It was first performed in Masterton in 1968, and was performed in Tauranga in 1970. In spite of its few performances, it is regarded as a landmark in New Zealand music, by reason of its large scale, local content and experimental nature. A Royal Command Performance was recorded at Mercury Theatre in Auckland in 1971.

=== Under the Sun ===
Under the Sun was commissioned by the city of Palmerston North to commemorate its centenary. It was performed six times during the week of 24–30 May 1971. It tells the history of the Sun, from the formation of the Earth through the entire span of life on Earth till the Sun cools. (quote: ...And the star... goes out!) It is scored for four orchestras in each corner of the auditorium, a five-member rock group, two adult choirs half-way up both sides of a large open auditorium, and four "floor choirs" totalling 440 children who act and dance as well as sing. Each has its own conductor, coordinated by listening through headphones to a tape of McLeod herself counting beats and bars. (Another track of the tape carries the narration.) At the end of act four, which brings the audience to the present (in the hippie era), which features the incorporated Pop Song 'Shadow People' the audience is invited to join in the dancing. The production involved 1000 people and took two years to bring to performance. Children from 16 schools contributed 2000 paintings of which 70 were chosen to be projected on silver screens at each end of the auditorium. The show was produced (US: directed) by Peter Tulloch. A recording of a whole performance was published, as well as a single of the incorporated Act Four song in popular style, Shadow People performed by Grant Bridger and the local three-piece group, 'The Forgiving'.

=== The Emperor and the Nightingale ===
Commissioned in 1985 by the Wellington Regional Orchestra (now Orchestra Wellington) for a family concert under Sir William Southgate, as part of the 1986 New Zealand International Festival of the Arts in Wellington, The Emperor and the Nightingale has subsequently been performed by a number of New Zealand regional and youth orchestras. The version recorded here was revised by the composer in 2010. The text was adapted by the composer from Hans Christian Andersen's fairy tale The Nightingale, in the English version found in The Yellow Fairy Book (1894) edited by Andrew Lang (1844–1912) and translated by Leonora Blanche Alleyne Lang (1851–1933).

=== Rock Concerto ===
The Rock Concerto began life in 1986 as a (first) Rock Sonata for piano, a work with strong classical roots and in places of Lisztian difficulty, commissioned by the New Zealand pianist Bruce Greenfield for his gifted virtuoso pupil the seventeen-year-old Eugene Albulescu. (Partly on the strength of this score, the composer was invited in 1987 as an international guest composer to a ten-day contemporary music festival in Kentucky, hosted by the Louisville Orchestra for its fortieth anniversary.) At Albulescu's request, in 2009 she scored and revised the rock sonata as a piano concerto which he might also direct from the keyboard.

The first two movements are in sonata form, each complete with first subject, transition theme, and contrasting second group, with a classical-type development section, at the end of which there is also an opportunity for an improvised cadenza (Albulescu's idea, and an uncommon feature of his performances—by his own desire held well in check, however, in the present recording). Though the music is newly composed, and its rhythmic language is very much of our own time (in a popular sense), it is also strongly impelled by the spirit of Beethoven (Mozart, Schubert, Liszt, Debussy, Gershwin...)—the "distant friends" referred to in the first movement. Another friend was Charlie French, to whom the second, rather darker movement (scored for solo piano, strings and flute alone) is dedicated. Charlie was an Australian aboriginal activist who shared her home in Wellington for a time and later succumbed, alas, as an early victim of AIDS. The headlong last movement is in rondo-sonata form, with a Latino romp as its recurring rondo, a nursery-type second theme, and a development-cum-episode that starts in a quasi-Iberian vein. Each movement has a coda (in the first and last cases quite extended), and each may also be played independently.

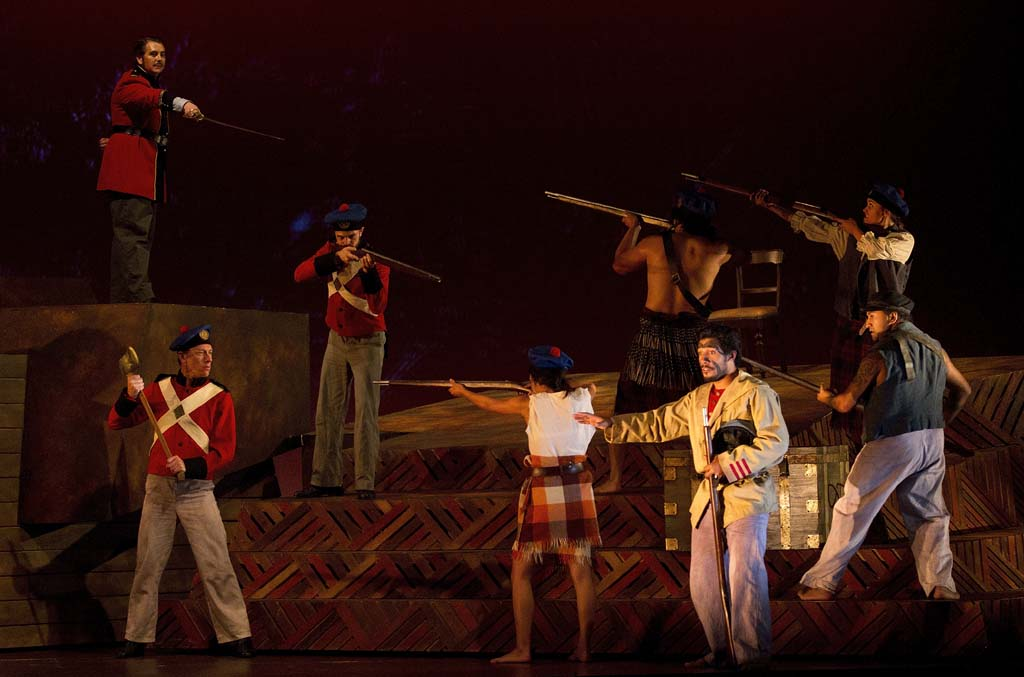
Hōhepa

=== Hōhepa ===
The New Zealand International Arts Festival premiered McLeod's opera Hōhepa in 2012. The opera is based on a true story of the Māori chief Hōhepa Te Umuroa and a British settler Thomas Mason during the Land Wars of the 1800s. It was developed by McLeod over 15 years and requested by Matiu Mareikura of the Ngāti Rangi iwi.

== Songs and hymns ==
Several of McLeod's songs were written for 1,000 children and the Bach Choir, which was performed at the Sun Festival in Oriental Bay, Wellington Harbour in December 1983 as part of Summer City. The work took three months to score, rehearse and perform and was McLeod's biggest choral event. Each song is based on a different colour. One that is still performed is Indigo II (Light of Lights").

McLeod wrote many hymns in Māori for the annual choral competitions Katorika Hui Aranga held in the Whanganui region at Easter.

== Publications ==
- Music in New Zealand Spring 1992 / number 18
- Music in New Zealand Summer 1998–99 / number 34
- Tone Clock Theory Expanded: Chromatic Maps I & II
