= Phillip Rhodes (baritone) =

New Zealand opera singer

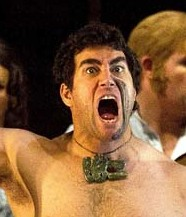
- In Hōhepa, 2012
- Born: Flaxmere, Hastings District, New Zealand
- Occupation: Opera singer

Phillip Rhodes is a New Zealand-born baritone opera singer.

== Life ==
Rhodes was born in Hastings, Hawke's Bay, New Zealand. He is of Māori descent, with a Pākehā mother and affiliating to the iwi Ngāti Awa and Ngāti Kahungunu on his father's side. Rhodes was raised in poverty, in a state house, with an abusive alcoholic father who was frequently unemployed. At the age of nine his father died, and he and his five sisters were taken from his mother and put into foster care home named 'Wharekoa' in [Havelock North] from where, he attended Anderson park Primary then on to Havelock North Intermediate, before attending Havelock North High School. After their initial placement, Rhodes and his sisters were fostered by Flaxmere couple Pam (nee. Smith) and Henare Ngaera O'Keefe. The couple were community leaders who rehabilitated prison inmates and taken in over 200 foster children over 30 years; Henare O'Keefe was a Hastings councillor, and Pam O'Keefe was known as the "mother of Flaxmere".

In this more supportive family environment, Rhodes flourished. His love for music and performance was kindled while watching Henare O'Keefe singing and speak to enthralled audiences. After finishing high school, Rhodes enrolled in an acting course at the Eastern Institute of Technology. He switched to the singing school, but left after a year to care for his younger sister. He was a "singing barman" in Hastings when tenor Patrick Powers became a tutor at EIT; with his encouragement, Rhodes re-enrolled and graduated in 2004 with a Diploma in Arts and Voice. After graduation, Powers offered him free private tuition in exchange for occasional farm labour. With the help of Powers, Rhodes began entering competitions, and in 2007 won the Lexus Song Quest. The next day Dame Kiri Te Kanawa phoned him and offered to help him begin a career overseas; she compared his calibre as a singer to herself and Inia Te Wiata. By 2016 he was an established international opera singer, based in Wales and working with an opera company in Leeds. In July 2014 and October 2016 he returned to Hawke's Bay to raise money for his foster parents' charities, the U-Turn Trust and Te Aranga Marae; in 2016 he performed with Patrick Powers for the first time in ten years.

== Career ==
Supported by the Kiri Te Kanawa Foundation, Rhodes studied at the Auckland Opera Studio. He studied in Wales at the Cardiff International Academy of Voice before joining the Royal Opera House to sing Enrico in Lucia di Lammermoor. In 2004 he was selected as a PwC Dame Malvina Major Emerging Artist with New Zealand Opera. In 2011–2012 he was a Young Artist/Fellow supported by the Dame Malvina Major Foundation.

At the 2012 New Zealand Festival of the Arts Rhodes sang the title role in New Zealand Opera's world premiere of the Jenny McLeod opera Hōhepa.

Rhodes made his house debut at Nederlandse Reisopera in 2018, singing the villain Scarpia in a modern staging of Puccini's Tosca; he was praised for his dark voice and "wickedly raised eyebrow".

He first played Figaro in February 2020 with Opera North, in a revived 2015 production by Jo Davies of The Marriage of Figaro. He was praised for his "considerable acting skills and dark voice".

He made his debut with Scottish Opera singing the role of the Father in Hansel and Gretel. The production, physically distanced in response to the COVID-19 pandemic, was filmed on 19 December 2020.

In November 2020 Rhodes was one of a group of New Zealand singers in London who recorded the concert Whānau: London Voices of Aotearoa, far from home at the Royal Albert Hall. Rhodes' mother Pam O'Keefe had died on September 5, and he performed a song, "My Best Friend", his father had written for his mother. Unable to attend the funeral because of COVID-19 restrictions, Rhodes performed the aria "Nessun dorma" remotely. Rhodes returned to New Zealand in May 2021 to reunite with his adopted father. That month he sang Don Pizarro in a concert staging of Beethoven's Fidelio with the Auckland Philharmonia.

== Honours and awards ==
Rhodes was the winner of the 2005 New Zealand Aria Competition. In 2008 he won second place at the International Montserrat Caballé Competition.
