= Hōhepa Te Umuroa =

Te Ati Haunui-a-Paparangi youth

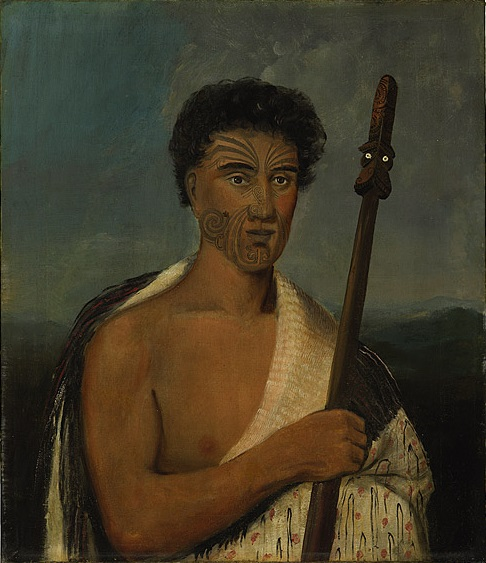
Portrait by William Duke, 1846

Hōhepa Te Umuroa (died 19 July 1847) was a Māori man of the Te Ati Haunui-a-Paparangi tribe (iwi). He is best known as a political prisoner, captured and sentenced with four others who fought alongside Te Rangihaeata. The men were sent to Darlington Probation Station, on Maria Island off the coast of Van Diemen's Land (now Tasmania). The terms of the prisoners' trial and sentencing are now regarded as questionable.

Te Umuroa died of tuberculosis in Tasmania, and was buried on Maria Island in a public cemetery, rather than in the convict cemetery. Following his death, the four other Māori men who had been held with him on Maria Island were released and in March 1848 were transported back to Auckland.

His remains were repatriated to Whanganui, New Zealand in 1988.

The story of Te Umuroa's capture and subsequent transportation and imprisonment in Tasmania for insurrection is told in The Trowenna Sea by Witi Ihimaera and the 2012 opera Hōhepa composed by Jenny McLeod.

== Portraits ==
During Te Umuroa's imprisonment on Tasmania's Maria Island, John Skinner Prout and William Duke painted his portrait.
