= Orchestra Wellington =

Professional orchestra in Wellington, New Zealand

- Orchestra
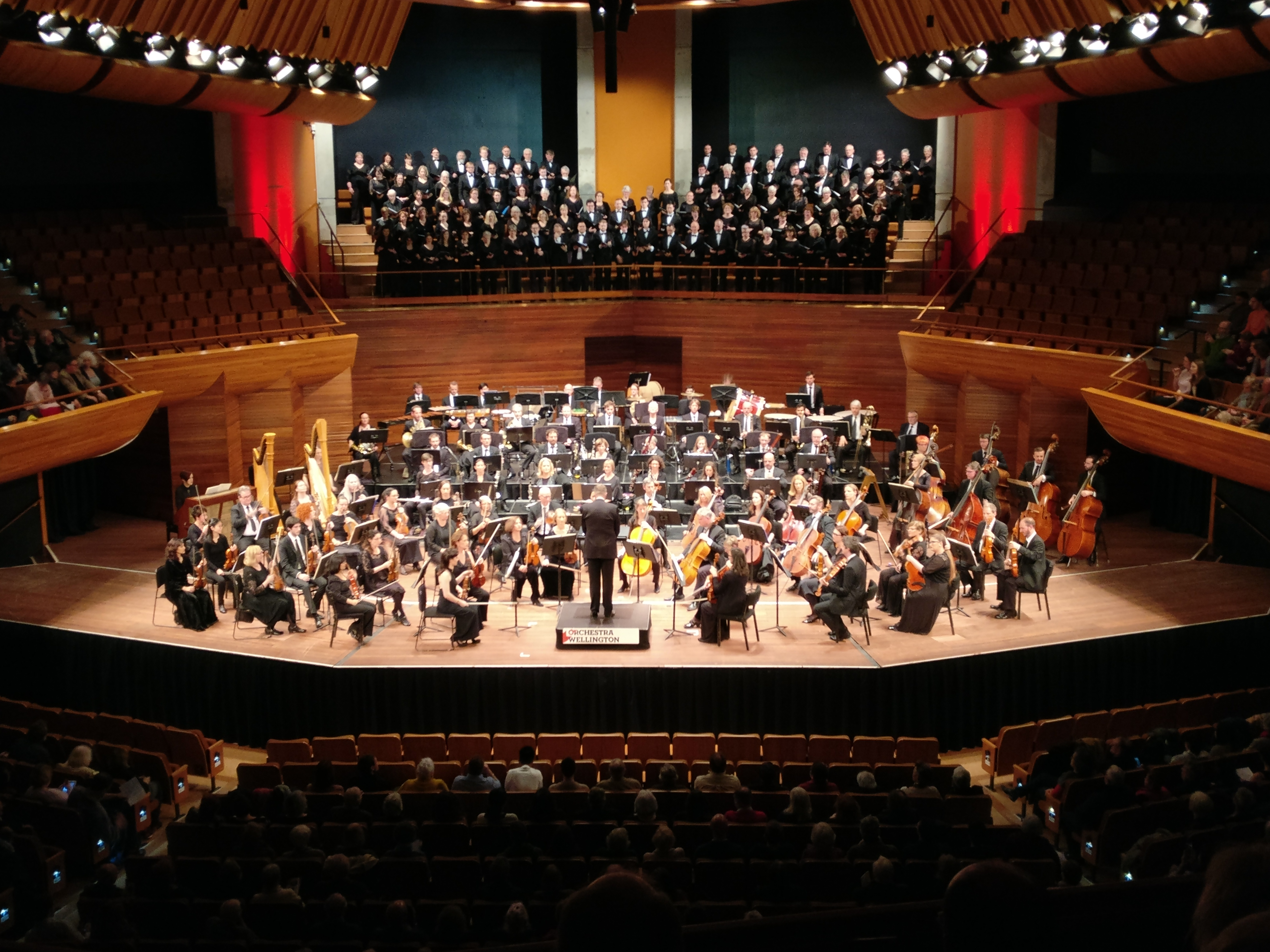
- Short name: OW
- Former name: Alex Lindsay String Orchestra (1948–1966); Lindsay String Orchestra of Wellington (1967–1973); Wellington Regional Orchestra (1974–1991); Wellington Sinfonia (1992–2004); Vector Wellington Orchestra (2005–2012)
- Founded: 1948; 78 years ago
- Location: Wellington, New Zealand
- Concert hall: Michael Fowler Centre
- Principal conductor: Marc Taddei (2007–)
- Website: www.orchestrawellington.co.nz

Orchestra Wellington is New Zealand's oldest professional regional orchestra, based in the capital city of Wellington. It hosts an annual subscription series of concerts in the Michael Fowler Centre, performing varied repertoire from the Classical, Romantic and contemporary periods. The orchestra commissions and performs works by New Zealand composers such as John Psathas ONZM. It also performs large choral works with the Orpheus Choir of Wellington, and regularly accompanies Wellington stage performances by the Royal New Zealand Ballet, New Zealand Opera, and Wellington Opera.

== History ==
Wellington has had a long orchestral tradition before the establishment of its current principal orchestra. In 1928, a previous Wellington orchestra, the Wellington Symphony Orchestra, was formed with hopes of becoming a national orchestra. With Leon de Mauny conducting, it put on its first concert in the Wellington Town Hall later that year in the presence of the Governor General. The concert was recorded and broadcast on the newly formed 2YA radio station, to good reviews. By 1940, losses from dwindling audiences and subscriptions partly due to the advent of World War II had threatened the orchestra with closure, and it ceased performing in 1941. The establishment of the National Orchestra in 1946, combined with a lack of players, made its revival untenable.

In 1948, New Zealand violinist Alex Lindsay founded a new orchestra as the Alex Lindsay String Orchestra, establishing it as an incorporated society, the Wellington Regional Orchestra Foundation, in 1950. It was renamed the Lindsay String Orchestra of Wellington in 1967, and re-established with assistance from the Arts Council of New Zealand in 1973 as the Wellington Regional Orchestra. In 1991 the orchestra was renamed Wellington Sinfonia, and in 2005 renamed again to Vector Wellington Orchestra. In 2012 the orchestra dropped the naming sponsorship from electricity company Vector and rebranded to its current name, Orchestra Wellington.

The orchestra has commissioned works by New Zealand composers and made them Composers in Residence: John Psathas in 2020 and Victoria Kelly in 2025.
