= Madeleine Pierard =

New Zealand opera singer

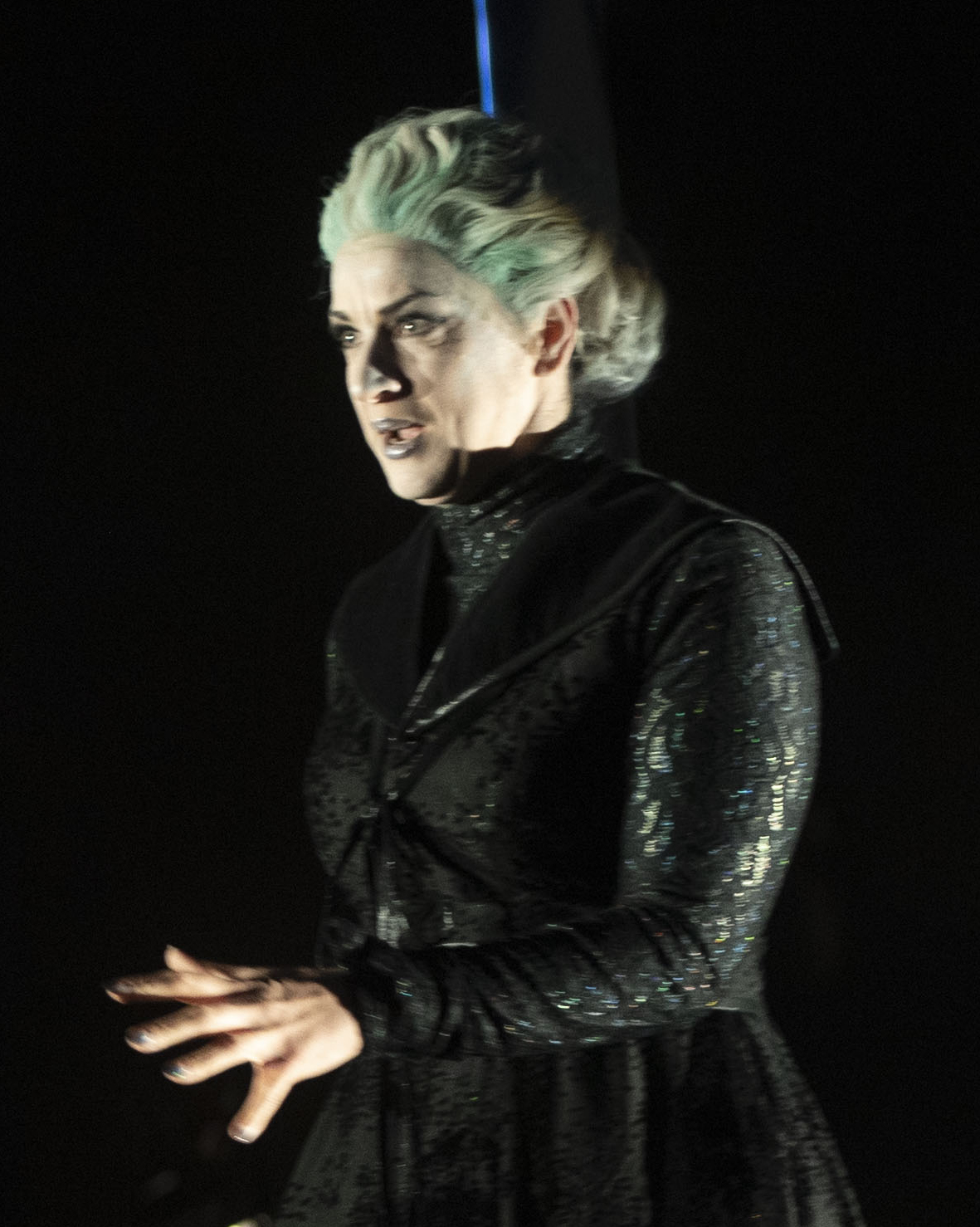
- Pierard performing the role of Miss Jessel in the New Zealand Opera production of The Turn of the Screw
- Born: New Zealand

Academic background
- Education: Royal College of Music, National Opera Studio, New Zealand School of Music
- Academic advisors: Lillian Watson, Yvonne Kenny

Academic work
- Institutions: The Royal Opera, New Zealand Opera, University of Waikato

Madeleine Sophie Clare Pierard is a New Zealand lyric soprano opera singer and teacher. She holds the Dame Malvina Major Chair in Opera at the University of Waikato.

== Early life and education ==
Pierard grew up in Napier. She was diagnosed with Non-Hodgkin lymphoma at the age of six, and spent two years in hospital. She enrolled in a biomedical degree, but soon found she preferred studying music, having studied piano. She started singing lessons whilst studying composition with Jack Body. Pierard sang in the New Zealand Youth Choir, The Tudor Consort and Voices New Zealand chamber choir.

Pierard earned a Bachelor of Music with Honours in performance and composition from Victoria University of Wellington, and a Master of music from the Royal College of Music in London, where she studied with Lillian Watson.

== Opera career ==
International performances include Richard Strauss's Four Last Songs with the English National Ballet at Sadler's Wells, Meleagro in Atalanta in the London Handel Festival, Justice in The First Commandment with the Classical Opera Company, Das erste Blumenmädchen in Parsifal, Marzelline in Fidelio, with the Auckland Philharmonia and New Zealand Opera, and Musetta in La Boheme with Longborough Festival Opera. Pierard sang Sandman in Hänsel und Gretel, High Priestess in Aida and Noémie in Cendrillon, all with The Royal Opera. She has appeared with Kiri Te Kanawa and Jonathan Lemalu, and performed a number of oratorios, including Carmina Burana, Mozart's Requiem and Haydn's Nelson Mass as St Martin-in-the-Fields under Ivor Setterfield, Verdi's Requiem with the Cleveland Philharmonic Orchestra, Haydn's The Creation in the King's Lynn Festival and Vaughan Williams' Dona Nobis Pacem and Karl Jenkins' The Armed Man at The Royal Festival Hall.

New Zealand performances include the female lead in Purcell's Dido and Aeneas with the Christchurch Symphony Orchestra in 2023, and Brahms' Lieder with Michael Houstoun in the Hawke's Bay Festival.

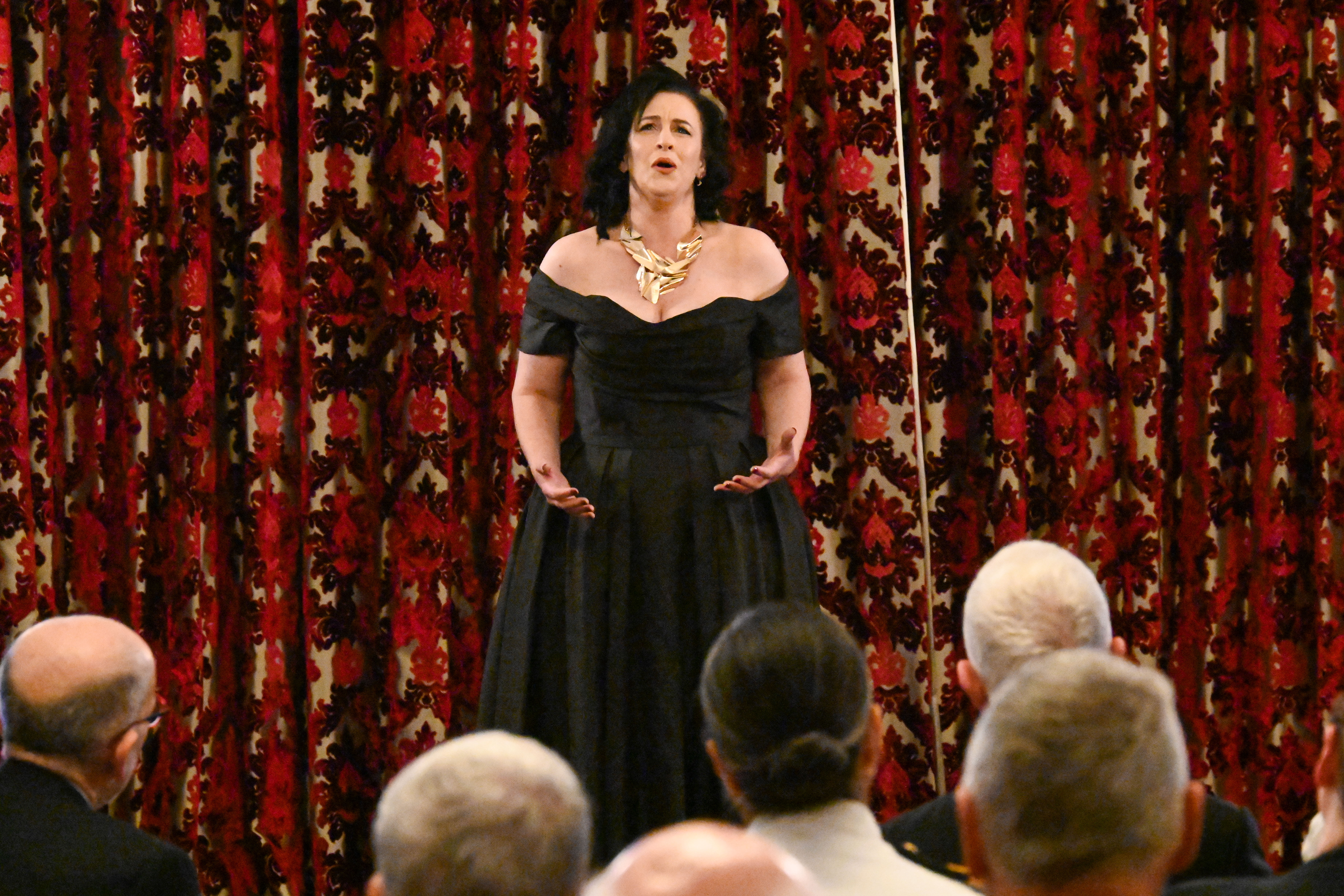
Pierard performing at the Dame Malvina Major Foundation's 35th anniversary concert, at Government House, Wellington, on 11 March 2026

Pierard was appointed as the Dame Malvina Major Chair in Opera at the University of Waikato in 2022.

== Awards ==
Pierard has won a number of awards and scholarships while studying and performing. Pierard won the Lexus Song Quest in 2005, the Dame Malvina Major Foundation's Mina Foley Award in 2014, the Lies Askonas and the Royal Overseas League Prize, and was a Jette Parker Young Artist at the Royal Opera, Covent Garden. Pierard also won the Les Azuriales Ozone Opera Competition on the Côte d'Azur, France, and the Elm Vocal Award at the Wigmore Hall, England, and won a New Generation Award from the New Zealand Arts Foundation.

== Personal life ==
Pierard is married to conductor and violinist Michael Joel. They have three daughters. In her spare time, Pierard likes to ice cakes. Pierard's older sister Anna Pierard is also an opera singer.
