= Coad =

Coad is a surname. Notable people with the surname include:

- Basil Coad (1906–1980), senior British Army officer
- Ben Coad (born 1994), English cricketer
- Conal Coad, Australian opera singer
- Emma Dent Coad (born 1954), British architectural historian and politician
- Frank Coad (1930–2021), Australian racing driver
- Jane Coad, New Zealand public health nutrition researcher
- Jez Coad, British record producer and musician
- Joyce Coad (1917–1987), American child actress
- Matthew Coad (disambiguation), several people
- Merwin Coad (1924–2025), American minister and politician from Iowa
- Michael Coad (born 1983), Australian football player
- Nellie Coad (1883–1974), New Zealand teacher, community leader, women's advocate and writer
- Paddy Coad (1920–1992), Irish football player and manager
- Peter Coad (born 1953), software entrepreneur and author
- Richard Coad (1825–1900), British architect from Cornwall
