= Dame Malvina Major Foundation =

The Dame Malvina Major Foundation, named after New Zealand soprano Malvina Major was established in 1991.

The foundation fundraises as a charitable trust and offers a range of support and scholarships and prizes to emerging New Zealanders in performing arts. It has regional committees in Auckland, Waikato, Taranaki, Wellington, Christchurch and Dunedin. The foundation has many volunteers who support the running of it.

One programme they offer is with New Zealand Opera. In 2022, the recipients of this studio programme were: Katherine Winiata, Emmanuel Fonoti-Fuimaono and Hannah Ashford-Beck. The foundation also provide prizes at the Lexus Song Quest singing competitions.

== Dame Malvina Major Award ==
A $50,000 award that started in 2020 and is funded by Hamilton thoroughbred horse breeder Joan Egan.

Award winners:

- Soprano – Natasha Te Rupe Wilson, 2021
- Tenor – Amitai Pati of Sol3 Mio, 2020

== Scholarships ==
=== Ryman Healthcare DMMF Mina Foley Award ===
Mina Foley was a New Zealand soprano who rose to fame in the 1950s.

Award winners are:

- Ana James 2008
- Wendy Dawn Thompson 2009
- Wade Kernot 2010
- Andrew Glover 2011
- Anna Leese 2012
- Shaun Dixon 2013
- Madeleine Pierard 2014
- Rachelle Pike 2015
- James Benjamin Rodgers 2016
- Jonathan Abernethy 2017
- Amelia Berry 2018
- Holly Mathieson 2019
- Amitai Pati 2020
- Bianca Andrew 2021

=== DMMF Scholarship in association with the New Zealand Opera School ===
This scholarship is awarded to a student of the New Zealand Opera School.

- Emmanuel Fonoti-Fuimaono 2022

=== Cecily Maccoll High Achiever Award – Canterbury ===
This award is a legacy of Cecily Maccoll and is granted as part of the Christchurch Arts Excellence Awards.

- Soprano – Aivale Cole 2012
- Cellist – Catherine Kwak 2013
- Tenor – Harry Grigg 2014
- UC Christchurch Youth Orchestra 2015
- The Herzog Klaviertrio 2016
- Flautist – Matthew Lee 2017
- Baritone – Angus Simmons 2018
- Conductor – Daniel Cooper 2019
- Violinist – Thomas Bedggood 2020
- Violinist – Rose Light 2021

=== Alice Cole Piano Scholarship – Auckland/Waikato ===
The scholarship is a legacy of Alice Cole for piano students between the ages of 14 and 21 in the Auckland and Waikato regions.

- Lawrence Wong 2010
- Sylvia Chen 2011
- Jason Bae 2012
- Lucy Zeng 2013
- Arnold Lee 2015
  Leon Chen 2016
- Tony Chen 2017
- Siyu Sun 2018
- Ashani Waidyatillake and Jessica Chi 2019
- Sunny Lee, runner up Audrey Guo 2020
- It has been postponed during 2021 and 2022 COVID-19 health measures

=== Peter Lees-Jeffries Memorial Scholarship ===
Peter Lees-Jeffries was a Christchurch theatrical designer and teacher. This scholarship is for $2500 for professional development. It is not awarded every year.

- Jacquie Boer (nee Hanham) 1995
- Hedda Oosterhoff 2009
- Andrew McKenzie 2010
- Jessica Verryt 2012
- Kate Middleton-Olliver 2015
- Jacqueline Coats, opera director 2018
- Abigail Boyle, ballet dancer 2019
- Antonia Kamu, director 2021

=== Maxwell Fernie Dame Malvina Major Foundation Award ===
The award honours Maxwell Fernie and is for a young keyboard artist to further their education or training.

- William McElwee 2021

=== Italian for New Zealand Opera Singers Masterclasses ===
A scholarship to attend Italian for NZ Opera Singers Masterclasses in Italy run by Patricia Hurley.

- Carleen Ebbs, Claire Egan, Tavis Gravatt 2012
- Moses Mackay, Polly Ott 2013
- Christie Cook, Daniel O’Connor, Julien Van Mellaerts 2014
- Madison Nonoa, Jarvis Dams 2015
- Eliza Boom, Katherine McIndoe, Kieran Rayner, Oliver Sewell 2016
- Natasha Wilson, Marlena Devoe, Jonathan Eyers 2017
- Joanna Foote, Elisabeth Harris, Harry Grigg, Ben Reason 2018
- Pasquale Orchard, Joel Amosa, Stephen Diaz, Timothy Carpenter 2019

=== Sir Howard Morrison Vocal Scholarship ===
This scholarship has ceased. It was run by Sir Owen Glenn and the Glenn Family Trust in collaboration with the Dame Malvina Major Foundation in recognition of Howard Morrison. for a New Zealand performer aged between 16 and 32 years of age. The final year of the scholarship was in 2019.

- Te Waikamihi Korohina-Ormsby 2010
- Amina Edris 2012, 2011
- Oriana Kershaw 2013, 2014
- Madison Nonoa, Jarvis Dams, Joel Amosa 2015
- Blaire White 2016
- Pasquale Orchard 2018
- Hannah Bryant 2019

== Aria Prizes ==
=== Lockwood New Zealand Aria ===
This is a $20,000 first prize held annually in Rotorua.

First Prize Winners

- Julia Booth 2008
- Pene Pati 2009
- Amelia Berry 2010
- Stacey Alleaume 2011
- Stephen Diaz 2012
- James Ioelu 2013
- Isabella Moore 2014
- Amitai Pati 2015
- Frederick Jones 2016
- Jarvis Dams 2017
- Manase Latu 2018
- Elizabeth Mandeno 2019

=== Dame Malvina Major Foundation Christchurch Aria ===
First Prize winners

- Maia Vegar 2013
- Isabella Moore 2014
- Madison Nonoa 2015
- Elisabeth Harris 2016
- Eliza Boom 2017
- Laura Loach 2018
- Anna Simmons (1st), Olivia Sheat (2nd) 2019
- Erica Paterson 2021

=== Dame Malvina Major Foundation Waikato Conservatorium of Music Aria ===
University of Waikato Conservatorium of Music

- 2018 – First prize: Katie Trigg; second prize: Taylor Wallbank; third prize: Calla Knudson-Hollebon
- 2019 – First prize: Aidan Phillips; second prize: Alfred Fuimaono; third prize: Tayla Alexander
- 2021 – First prize: Emmanuel Fonoti Fuimaono and Alfred Fonoti-Fuimaono; third prize: Jordan Fonoti-Fuimaono

=== Dame Malvina Major Foundation Wellington Aria ===
First prize winners:

- Amelia Berry 2009
- Bryony Williams 2010
- Daniela-Rosa Young 2011
- Isabella Moore 2012
- Christie Cook 2013
- Christian Thurston 2014
- Katherine McIndoe 2015
- Frederick Jones 2016
- Madison Nonoa 2017
- Will King 2018
- Sophie Sparrow 2019

=== Dame Malvina Major Foundation Dunedin Aria ===
First prize winners:

- Christie Cook 2013
- Isabella Moore 2014
- Eliza Boom 2015
- Filipe Manu 2016
- Natasha Wilson 2017
- Olivia Pike 2018
- Laura Loach 2019

=== Dame Malvina Major Foundation ===
Second prize winners ODT Aria Contest:

- Julien Van Mellaerts 2009
- Julien Van Mellaerts 2010
- Kawiti Waetford 2011
- Grace Park 2012

=== Dame Malvina Major Foundation ===
Napier Aria first prize Winners:

- Natasha Wilson 2018
- Manase Latu 2019

=== North Shore Becroft Aria ===
Second prize winners:

- Will King 2018
- Christina McDonald 2019
