= Ian Stoutzker =

British banker and musician (1929–2024)

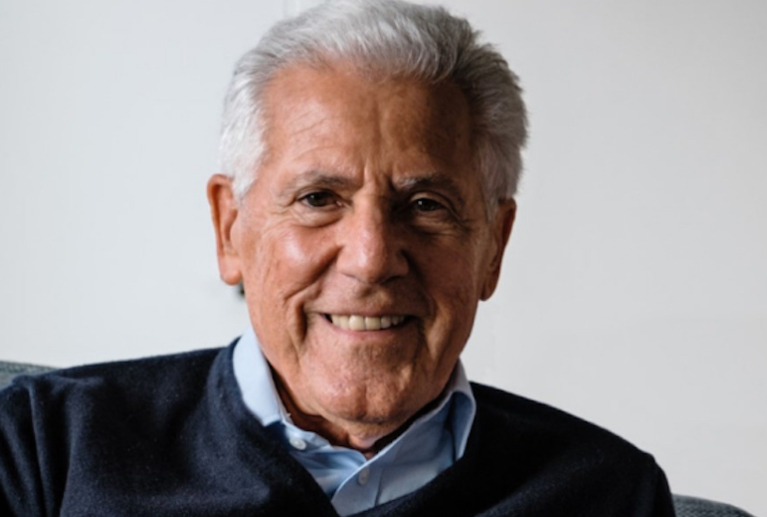
Stoutzker in 2021

Sir Ian Isaac Stoutzker CBE (21 January 1929 – 6 April 2024) was a British banker, musician and philanthropist. He was involved in Royal College of Music, where he studied violin and was a member of the council. Throughout his life, Stoutzker engaged in endeavours related to arts and music, including with the Philharmonia Orchestra, Live Music Now, the London Symphony Orchestra, the European Union Youth Orchestra.

== Biography ==
Ian Isaac Stoutzker was born in London, England, on 21 January 1929. His father was the cantor at the Central Synagogue in London. His mother, Dora Cohen, was a piano teacher in Tredegar, Wales. He was educated at Berkhamsted School and at the London School of Economics.

Stouzker studied the violin with the English violinist Albert Sammons at the Royal College of Music. In 1968, he became a member of the council of the Royal College and served for 31 years. On retirement in 1999, he was made a vice president of the college.

Stoutzker held the appointment as chairman of the Philharmonia Orchestra from 1973 to 1976, and was president of the orchestra from 1976 to 1979. Following the death of its principal conductor, Otto Klemperer, in 1973, the New Philharmonia Orchestra needed financial support and new musical leadership. The financial support was provided when for the first time a non-playing member of a London orchestra was appointed chairman. In 1997, he proposed and oversaw the change of its name from the "New Philharmonia Orchestra" to its original name of the "Philharmonia Orchestra".

In 1977, Yehudi Menuhin and Stoutzker founded Live Music Now. Stoutzker was appointed chairman in 1978. In 2018, Stoutzker passed the role of chairman to Vernon Ellis while remaining as president.

In 1992, Stoutzker was invited to chair the Advisory Council of the London Symphony Orchestra. He retired in 2007 and was awarded honorary membership of the London Symphony Orchestra.

From 2008, Stoutzker and his wife lived in Salzburg, Austria.

In 2014, Stoutzker became co-chairman of the European Union Youth Orchestra. He served in this position until 2020. At a meeting of the board in December 2020, a resolution was adopted:

Sir Ian has used his skills and judgement in maintaining and developing the EUYO's financial resources, preserving the highest musical standards, developing creative ties with artistic partners. Sir Ian has been tireless in pursuit of these ends and has always made himself readily available for advice and comment. Knowledgeable, generous, fearless and shrewd in his judgements, Sir Ian's contribution to the Orchestra's welfare, even its continuation, cannot be exaggerated. This Board resolution reflects our gratitude. The board welcomes too his continuing involvement in the EUYO through his chairmanship of the EUYO Advisory Council.

Stoutzker died on 6 April 2024, at the age of 95.

== Philanthropy ==
Stoutzker and his wife Mercedes gifted nine works to the Tate Gallery including works by Lucian Freud, David Hockney, Peter Doig and Hurvin Anderson. In 2011, Stoutzker gifted £500,000 for the Dora Stoutzker Hall at the Royal Welsh College of Music and Drama, in memory of his mother who was a music teacher in Tredegar, South Wales. He contributed to acquiring the 'Viotti Stradivari' violin for the Royal Academy of Music's instrument collection.

== Other activities ==
- 1980–2004 — Member – Finance Committee of the Musicians Benevolent Fund
- 1992–2003 — Co-chairman – Voices Foundation

== Awards ==
- 1969 – Fellow of the Royal College of Music
- 1993 – Order of the British Empire
- 2006 – Honorary Member of the London Symphony Orchestra
- 2008 – Honorary Fellow of the Royal Academy of Music — "With the possible exception of George Frideric Handel, no individual has done more to bring music to children and the disadvantaged in the history of this country than Ian Stoutzker."
- 2011 – Fellow of the Royal Welsh College of Music and Drama
- 2012 – Commander of the British Empire for services to Music
- 2013 – Prince of Wales Medal for Arts Philanthropy – a joint award with Lady Stoutzker
- 2017 – Robert Maskrey Award for Arts Philanthropy
- 2019 – Knighthood "For services to Music and to Philanthropy" — Queen's Birthday Honours
- 2020 – Honorary Member of the Royal Society of Musicians of Great Britain
