= Les Azuriales Opera =

Les Azuriales Opera is an Anglo-French organisation that focuses on finding outstanding young artists and making a significant difference to their early operatic careers. Its activities take place in Cap Ferrat, Villefranche-sur-Mer and London.

== Young Artist Programme ==
Les Azuriales Young Artist Programme, lasting approximately two weeks, takes place each year in August at the Villa Ephrussi de Rothschild on Cap Ferrat, and the Citadelle Saint-Elme in Villefranche-sur-Mer, both on the Côte d'Azur near Nice in France. The programme consists of a singing competition (with prizes of €10,000), public and private masterclasses and an opera performance put together from scratch in a week.

Each year more than 100 singers from around the world are auditioned and 8 to 10 are chosen to become Les Azuriales Young Artists. Les Azuriales has strong links with South Korea, South Africa, Armenia and Russia.

The distinguished givers of its public master classes and private workshops have included: Lucy Arner, Sally Burgess, Peter Coleman-Wright, Michèle Crider, Sarah-Jane Davies, Peter Kazaras, Ljuba Kazarnovskaya, Elaine Kidd, Martin Lloyd-Evans, Emanuele Moris, Dennis O'Neill, Pedro Ribeiro, Brindley Sherratt and Alessandro Talevi.

A number of its young artists have been winners or finalists of major competitions, including the Montserrat Caballé Prize, the Kathleen Ferrier Award, the Stella Maris awards and Cardiff Singer of the World.

Seven of its alumni have joined London's Royal Opera’s Jette Parker Young Artists programme. Others have been to the National Opera Studio (UK), Vienna State Opera and other prestigious programmes.

Les Azuriales Opera is unusual as a young artist programme in that it provides ongoing moral and financial support to its young artists.

== Background ==
Les Azuriales Opera is administered almost entirely by volunteers (as opposed to the musical organisation, which is entirely professional). It is privately funded by private and corporate donors.

The structure consists of

- Les Azuriales Opera Trust – a UK registered charity
- L'Association des Amis du Festival "Les Azuriales" – the official organisation that runs Les Azuriales activities in France: it is an officially registered "Association" (Siret: 440 834 349 00019)
- A Comité d'Honneur whose members provide support and advice. its members are: Richard Salter, Sir Vernon Ellis, Dame Antoinette Sibley and Christopher Hampson.

The musical organisation is under the guidance of Bryan Evans, the music director of Diva Opera, who is also Les Azuriales' music director. Sarah-Jane Davies, head of casting at Scottish Opera, plays a key role as artistic consultant and Alessandro Talevi is Les Azuriales' resident guest director.

== History ==
In 1996 Sarah Holford, an English commercial barrister, was introduced to Bryan Evans who had recently founded a chamber opera company in England, Diva Opera. Evans had been presenting chamber opera in country houses and similar venues for many years. With support from Diva Opera in 1997 Sarah Holford founded Les Azuriales Opera Festival principally centred on the Villa Ephrussi de Rothschild on Cap Ferrat: she had been visiting the area almost every year since she was a child. Diva Opera became the long term opera partner of the festival and itself continues to perform opera in many parts of Europe. Another major contributor was Dominique Lelandais, a resident of St Jean, whose drive and local knowledge were key factors in bringing the festival to life.

In 2003 Les Azuriales started its Young Artist Programmes as part of its festival, some of which are now held at Villa Ephrussi de Rothschild.

In 2015 Les Azuriales ceased to be present an opera festival and changed to its present format with its summer season concentrating solely on its Young Artist Programme. In April 2017 they held a Gala Benefit Concert at the Barbican for New Zealand opera star, Anna Leese, whose husband has crippling motor neurone disease. Sir Thomas Bevan hosted the event, that included other stars such as Sophie Bevan and Jacques Imbrailo.

== See also ==
- List of opera festivals
