= Maori Songs =

1999 album by Kiri Te Kanawa

Studio album by Kiri Te Kanawa
- Released: 17 November 1999
- Recorded: 1998–1999
- Label: EMI
- Producer: John Fraser

Kiri Te Kanawa chronology
French Songs and Arias (1997)	Maori Songs (1999)	Kiri – The Best Of (2001)

Maori Songs is a traditional album released by New Zealand opera diva, Kiri Te Kanawa in 1999 to celebrate the new millennium.

Maori Songs was recorded at Revolver Studios & NO 2 Studio, Abbey Rd.

== Track listing ==
1. "Hine E Hine"
2. "Tarakihi (The Locust)"
3. "Moe Mai E Hine"
4. "Hoea Ra"
5. "Matangi"
6. "Huri Huri"
7. "E Papa (Titi Torea/E Aue)"
8. "Ara Ka Titiro"
9. "Hoki Hoki Tonu Mai"
10. "Po Ata Rau (Now Is The Hour)"
11. "Piki Mai"
12. "Haere Ra E Hine"
13. "E Pari Ra"
14. "Akoako O Te Rangi"
15. "Tahi Nei Taru Kino"
16. "Po Karekare Ana"

== Lyrics ==
Lyrics and score of Māori music available here: http://folksong.org.nz/waiata.html

== Charts ==
=== Weekly charts ===
Chart (1999)	Peak position
New Zealand Albums (RMNZ)	4

=== Year-end charts ===
Chart (2000)	Position
New Zealand Albums (RMNZ)	17
