= Tokyo Global Concert =

Tokyo Global Concert (東京国際コンサート, Tōkyō Kokusai Konsāto) is a music event aimed at the promotion of arts, culture and international development held in Tokyo, Japan inviting renowned opera singers from around the world.

It has been organized by the International Foundation for Arts and Culture (IFAC), a non-profit organization with Haruhisa Handa as its chairman, created as an opportunity for the purpose of enjoying classical music free of charge under the concept for a wish for more people to enjoy and love classical music.

== Outline ==
Haruhisa Handa, chairman as well as the organizer of IFAC, stated “I wanted to offer an opportunity for people to experience world-class singing skills, creative expression and acting abilities by inviting principally the graduates from the Juilliard School, located in New York City, New York which is considered one of the most renowned creative arts institutions in the world.” He also wished to make Tokyo the worldwide No. 1 metropolis of culture and sports, and is particularly committed to the organization of concerts and Noh-play theatres which are free of charge in an effort to promote cultural development.

Handa also invites young Japanese musicians to perform and learn from world-class artists, and he himself appears as the singer “Toshu Fukami”.

Yoshinobu Kuribayashi, the deputy chairman of IFAC, comments about the significance of the concert, “offering an opportunity for the audience to listen to the singing of world-class performers would consequently contribute to increase the number of fans of operatic arts and cause the vocal music world to prosper in Japan.”

== List ==
Year	Date	Venue	Special Guest	Guest Artists
2013	September 10	Nakano Zero Grand Hall	Kiri Te Kanawa	Haruhisa Handa, Conal Coad and Takaoki Onishi
2014	June 18	Opera Palace, New National Theater	Renee Fleming	Haruhisa Handa, Conal Coad and Roberto Abbado
2015	June 15	Opera Palace, New National Theater	José Carreras	Haruhisa Handa and Conal Coad
2015	August 26	Tokyo International Forum	Plácido Domingo	Haruhisa Handa, Virginia Tola, Michaela Este and Eugene Cone

== Concert in 2013 ==
On September 10, 2013, the concert was held with an aim to develop artistic culture and international exchange at the Grand Hall of Nakano Zero located at Momiji-Yama Culture Center in Nakano-Ku, Tokyo with Kiri Te Kanawa and other performers who were mainly graduates and undergraduates of The Juilliard School, in New York City, New York. Haruhisa Handa and Conal Coad, guest artists had co-starred in Verdi’s opera “Nabucco", who had been acquainted with each other prior to the performance. During the performance intermission, Haruhisa Handa gave an interpretation of the classical pieces.

Kiri Te Kanawa greeted the audience with an expression of her joy to have been able to visit Japan and perform. Her appearance at this concert was a surprise.

=== Program ===
1st Part Performances by Haruhisa Handa and Conal Coad

Artists
- Haruhisa Handa (Baritone, Japan)
- Conal Coad (Bass, New Zealand)
- Phoebe Briggs (Piano, Philippines)

2nd Part Performances by undergraduates and graduates from the vocal course, at The
Juilliard School

Artists
- Takaoki Onishi (Baritone, Japan)
- Meredith Lasting (Soprano, USA)
- Kim Yujin (Tenor, South Korea)
- Lee Kuna (Piano, South Korea)

3rd Part Performances by Kiri Te Kanawa

Artist
- Kiri Te Kanawa

== Concert in 2014 ==
The concert was held at the Opera Palace, New National Theatre Tokyo on June 18, 2014. In addition to the 1,500 people in the audience who had won their tickets by a drawing of (5,800 applicants), 300 people including students of music colleges located in Japan were also invited. With Renee Fleming as the special guest, Haruhisa Handa (Baritone) and Conal Coad (Bass) appeared. The conductor, Roberto Abbado, was personally designated to conduct the concert by Fleming. The Tokyo City Philharmonic Orchestra accompanied the performance.

Handa formed a close friendship with Fleming with a personal introduction from his friend, Michael Bolton which consequently led to her third visit to Japan after an absence of eight years. Handa and Fleming, based on their shared conviction that music is entertainment and their purpose is just to make the audience content, that being said they had then carefully selected the pieces for the performance.

The concert was under the auspices of the Ministry of Foreign Affairs, The Tokyo Metropolis and the Embassy of the United States in Tokyo. Congratulatory telegrams were sent from Shinzo Abe (Prime Minister of Japan), Fumio Kishida (Foreign Minister), Hakubun Shimomura (Ministry of Education, Culture, Sports, Science and Technology), Yukio Hatoyama and Yoichi Masuzoe (Governor of Tokyo Metropolis).

Handa told the audience during his greetings that he wished them to listen to the mature vocal performance of a worldwide top-ranked soprano. Fleming expressed her gratitude, saying “I have always been on tour singing, but now I feel so happy to be in Japan again”.

It was announced that Handa will assume the post of co-chair of the organizing committee of the music festival to be held in New York City, New York featuring Fleming in 2015.

=== Program ===
1st Part Performances by Haruhisa Handa and Conal Coad

Artists
- Haruhisa Handa (Baritone, Japan)
- Conal Coad (Bass, New Zealand)

2nd Part Performances by Renee Fleming
Artist

- Renee Fleming

Encores

Artists
- Haruhisa Handa
- Conal Coad
- Renee Fleming

The encore consisted of a duet by Fleming and Handa, Fleming’s solo, and a trio of “Furusato” by all three of the artists with a wish for the recovery from horrific damage due to the Great East Japan earthquake. It was reported that many of the audience were brought to tears. According to Handa at his suggestion, was to have Fleming sing the song that all Japanese know which she accepted, and which then lead to the trio.

== Organizer ==
International Foundation for Arts and Culture, a special nonprofit incorporation.

== Supporters’ Organizations ==
- The Ministry of Foreign Affairs
- The Agency for Cultural Affairs
- The Embassy of the United States in Tokyo
- The Tokyo Metropolitan Government
