= Kiri – The Best Of =

Compilation album by Kiri Te Kanawa

Kiri

Greatest hits album by Kiri Te Kanawa
- Released: 29 Oct 2001
- Genre: Opera; classical; musicals
- Label: EMI Classics

Kiri Te Kanawa chronology
Maori Songs (1999)	Kiri (2001)	The Very Best Of (2003)

Kiri is a 2001 greatest hits album released by New Zealand opera diva, Kiri Te Kanawa.

This compilation is a comprehensive study of Kiri Te Kanawa's most memorable moments. It features 20 tracks from 4 different labels. Tracks include arias from The Marriage of Figaro, Tosca, La traviata, and her famous "O mio babbino caro". Also included is Let the bright Seraphim by Handel, which Te Kanawa sang at the wedding of Prince Charles and Diana, Princess of Wales in 1981.

The compilation spent two weeks in the UK albums chart, reaching number 73 in November 2001, and in the same month also peaked at number 3 in the UK classical album charts.

== Track listing ==
1. "Let the bright Seraphim" – Handel (Samson)
2. "Dove sono" – Mozart (Le nozze di Figaro) (Solti)
3. "Laudate Dominum" – Mozart
4. "Ave Maria" – Bach-Gounod
5. "Attendo, Attendo... Addio del passato" – Verdi (La traviata)
6. "Vissi d'arte" – Puccini (Tosca) (Solti)
7. "O mio babbino caro" – Puccini (Gianni Schicchi)
8. "Ecco: respiro appena. Io son l'umile ancella" – Cilea (Adriana Lecouvreur)
9. "Chi il bel sogno di Doretta" – Puccini (La rondine)
10. "Depuis le jour" – Gustave Charpentier (Louise)
11. "Pie Jesu" – Fauré (Requiem)
12. "Baïlèro" – Canteloube (Chants d'Auvergne)
13. "Tonight" – Bernstein (West Side Story)
14. "Summertime" – Gershwin (Porgy and Bess)
15. "Someone to Watch Over Me" – Gershwin
16. "Smoke Gets In Your Eyes" – Kern
17. "Let's Face The Music and Dance" – Berlin
18. "True Love" – Porter
19. "The World You're Coming Into" – McCartney
20. "World in Union" – Gustav Holst / Skarbek
