= Matthew Coad =

Matthew Coad may refer to:

- Matthew Coad (athlete) (born 1975), New Zealand sprinter
- Matthew Coad (footballer) (born 1984), English footballer
