= Mina Foley =

New Zealand coloratura soprano (1930–2007)

Wilhelmina Maile Foley (9 March 1930 – 21 January 2007) was a New Zealand coloratura soprano, who rose to prominence in the 1950s. She was the first of many to study under the acclaimed singing teacher Dame Sister Mary Leo. Other prominent singers who studied with Mary Leo included the internationally renowned soprano Dame Kiri Te Kanawa, soprano Dame Malvina Major, and mezzo-soprano Heather Begg. Foley's voice was dubbed "The voice of the century" by some.

On her 1955 New Zealand tour every concert was sold out. She studied abroad, and performed in Ireland, Italy, England, USA and Australia, returning to New Zealand in 1960. Foley had a severe mental breakdown in 1961, forcing her retirement after only one year performing in New Zealand. She spent the next 16 years in Oakley Psychiatric Hospital. In 1978 she staged a return concert. However, her return to singing was short-lived, and ill-health continued to plague her until her death in 2007.

== Recordings ==
There are three Mina Foley albums in print on the New Zealand label Ode Records. The Early Years (CDMANU1062) was released in 1991 and is a compilation of some of Foley's earliest recordings from the period 1949–1953. These recordings were made in New Zealand. Included are recordings of Verdi's 'Sempre Libera', Mozart's 'Der Holle Rache' (performed in English), Bellini's 'Casta Diva'and Donizetti's 'O luce di quest'anima'.

Songs For You (CDMANU1529) was released in 1996 and is an eighteen track compilation of classics including 'Ave Maria', 'How Great Thou Art' and 'The Lord's Prayer'.

Mina Foley and Michael Tarawhiti McGifford (CDMANU2061) was released on compact disc for the first time in 2007. It features a selection of songs for solo voice and duets performed by Foley with Michael Tarawhiti McGifford.

Stebbing Recording also released a 33 1/3 RPM Hi-Fi microgroove live recording "miniature concert" recorded at the Auckland Town Hall in 1961. Mina is accompanied on the album by the Saint Mary's College and School Of Music Massed Choir, trained by Sister (and later Dame) Mary Leo, and conducted by Patricia Price.

Side One features, Nun's Chorus by Strauss, and Low! Hear the Gentle Lark by Bishop; Side Two features La Virgine degli Angeli by Verdi, Vengeance Aria by Mozart, and The Nightingale and The Rose.

The Stebbing's website shows it as being on its Zodiac label but that title features nowhere on the physical disc or cover.
