= Malvina Major =

New Zealand opera soprano (born 1943)

Dame Malvina Major ONZ GNZM DBE
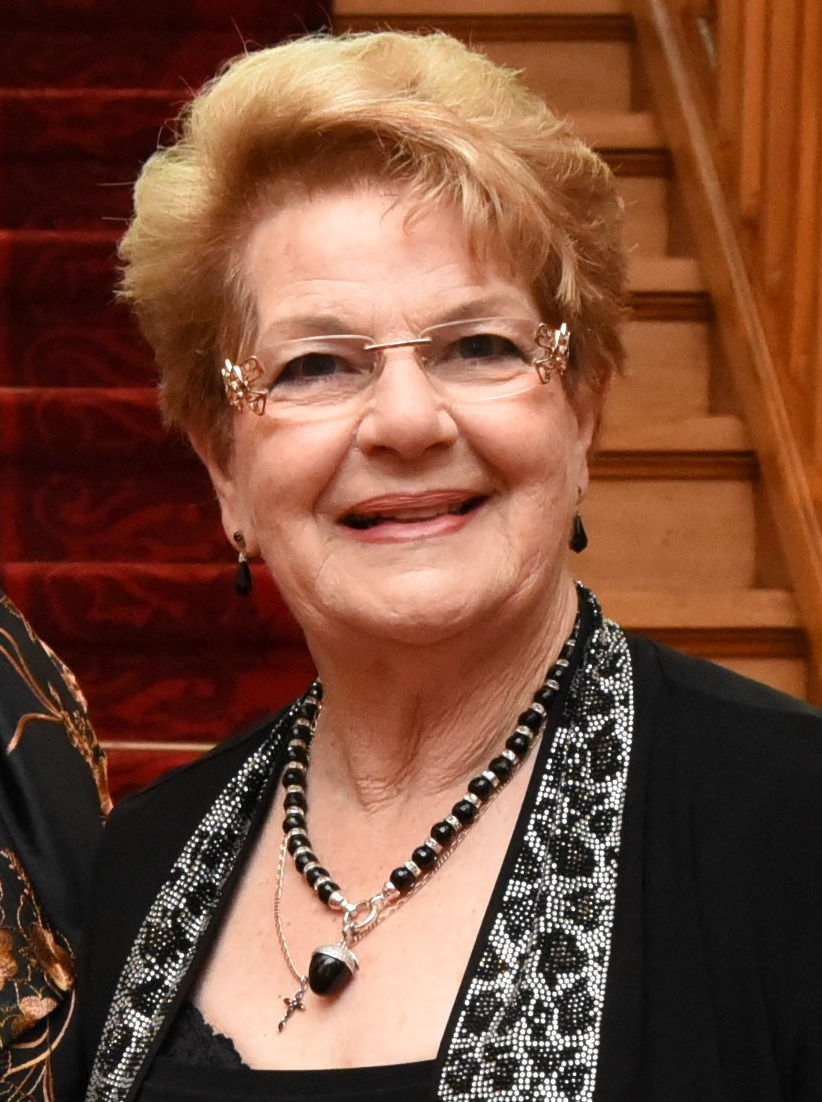
- Major in 2018
- Born: 28 January 1943 (age 83); Hamilton, New Zealand
- Occupation: Opera singer (soprano) • teacher
- Years active: 1965–present
- Spouse: Winston Fleming (m. 1965; died 1990)
- Children: 3

Dame Malvina Lorraine Major ONZ GNZM DBE (born 28 January 1943) is a New Zealand operatic soprano.

== Early life and family ==
Major was born in Hamilton on 28 January 1943, the daughter of Vincent and Eva Major. She grew up in a large musical family, and as a child she performed at various concerts, singing mainly country and western pop and music from the shows. She received her first classical training in 1955, from Sister Mary Magdalen at Ngāruawāhia, north of Hamilton. Sister Febronie continued with her voice training and Sister Liguori gave her piano tuition. As her potential blossomed, Major began travelling weekly to Ponsonby in Auckland, where she received further tuition from Dame Sister Mary Leo at St Mary's College. Sister Mary Leo was internationally recognised for having some of the country's best known singers, including Kiri Te Kanawa.

In 1965, Major married Winston William Richard Fleming, and the couple had three children. Fleming died in 1990.

== International recognition ==
Major moved to England for further study at the London Opera Centre under the guidance of teacher Ruth Packer. Her successes include winning the 1963 New Zealand Mobil Song Quest beating Te Kanawa who placed second (Te Kanawa later won the 1965 contest). She also won the Australian Melbourne Sun Aria competition in 1965, and the London-based Kathleen Ferrier Award in 1966. Major later performed in international concerts including a BBC concert broadcast in London, an outdoor concert at the pyramids in Egypt with the Cairo Symphony Orchestra, and a charity concert for Vera Lynn in London. She has performed more than 30 opera roles in their original languages.

In the 1985 Queen's Birthday Honours, Major was appointed an Officer of the Order of the British Empire, for services to opera. In 1990, she was awarded the New Zealand 1990 Commemoration Medal, and the following year she was promoted to Dame Commander of the Order of the British Empire, for services to opera and the community, in the 1991 Queen's Birthday Honours. She was made a Principal Companion of the New Zealand Order of Merit, for services to opera, in the 2008 New Year Honours. Following the restoration of titular honours by the New Zealand government, she accepted redesignation as a Dame Grand Companion of the New Zealand Order of Merit in 2009.

In 1998, Major received the Benny Award from the Variety Artists Club of New Zealand Inc. In 2008, Major performed a solo and duet with Hayley Westenra on the ChristChurch Cathedral Choir 2008 UK Tour. On 18 March 2011, Major performed in the national Christchurch memorial service at Hagley Park, Christchurch, in the presence of Prince William, Prime Minister John Key, Bob Parker, Hayley Westenra, ChristChurch Cathedral Choir, dignitaries, international rescue teams and tens of thousands of New Zealanders. On 25 February 2012, Major performed with soprano Amina Edris and tenor Chase Douglas in the Waikato Times Hamilton Gardens Arts Festival.

In the 2012 Queen's Birthday and Diamond Jubilee Honours, Major was appointed a Member of the Order of New Zealand, the country's highest civilian honour.

The Malvina Major Retirement Village in Wellington is named for her.

== Dame Malvina Major Foundation ==
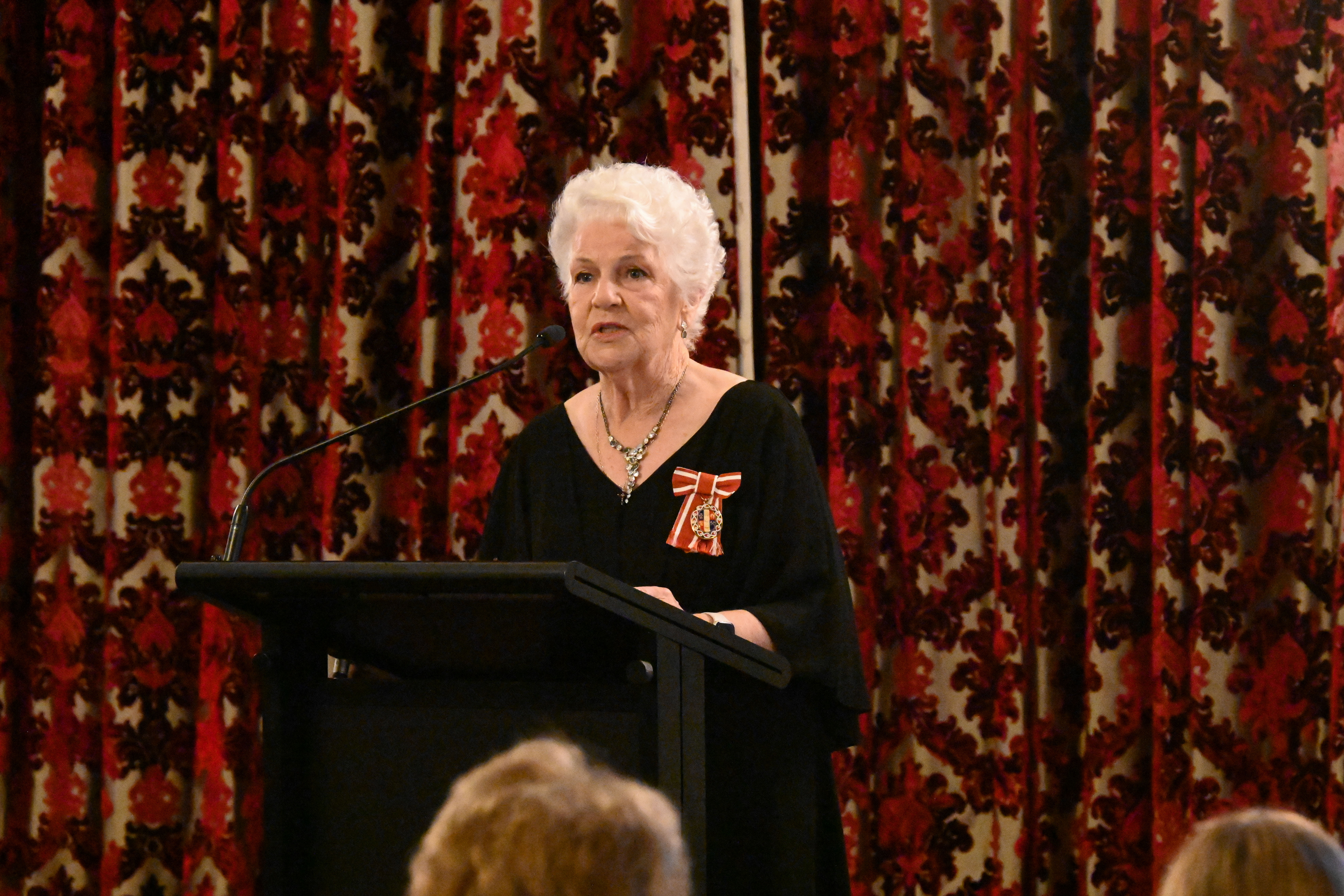
Major speaking at the Dame Malvina Major Foundation's 35th anniversary concert at Government House, Wellington, on 11 March 2026

In 1991 Dame Malvina established the Dame Malvina Major Foundation to promote education through awards and provide training for young New Zealanders in the performing arts. Recipients of the Foundation's annual $50,000 Dame Malvina Major Award include Amitai Pati and Natasha Te Rupe Wilson.

== Teaching ==
Major is listed in 2022 as an Associate at the music programme at the University of Waikato in Hamilton, New Zealand.
