= St Mary's College, Auckland =

St Mary's College

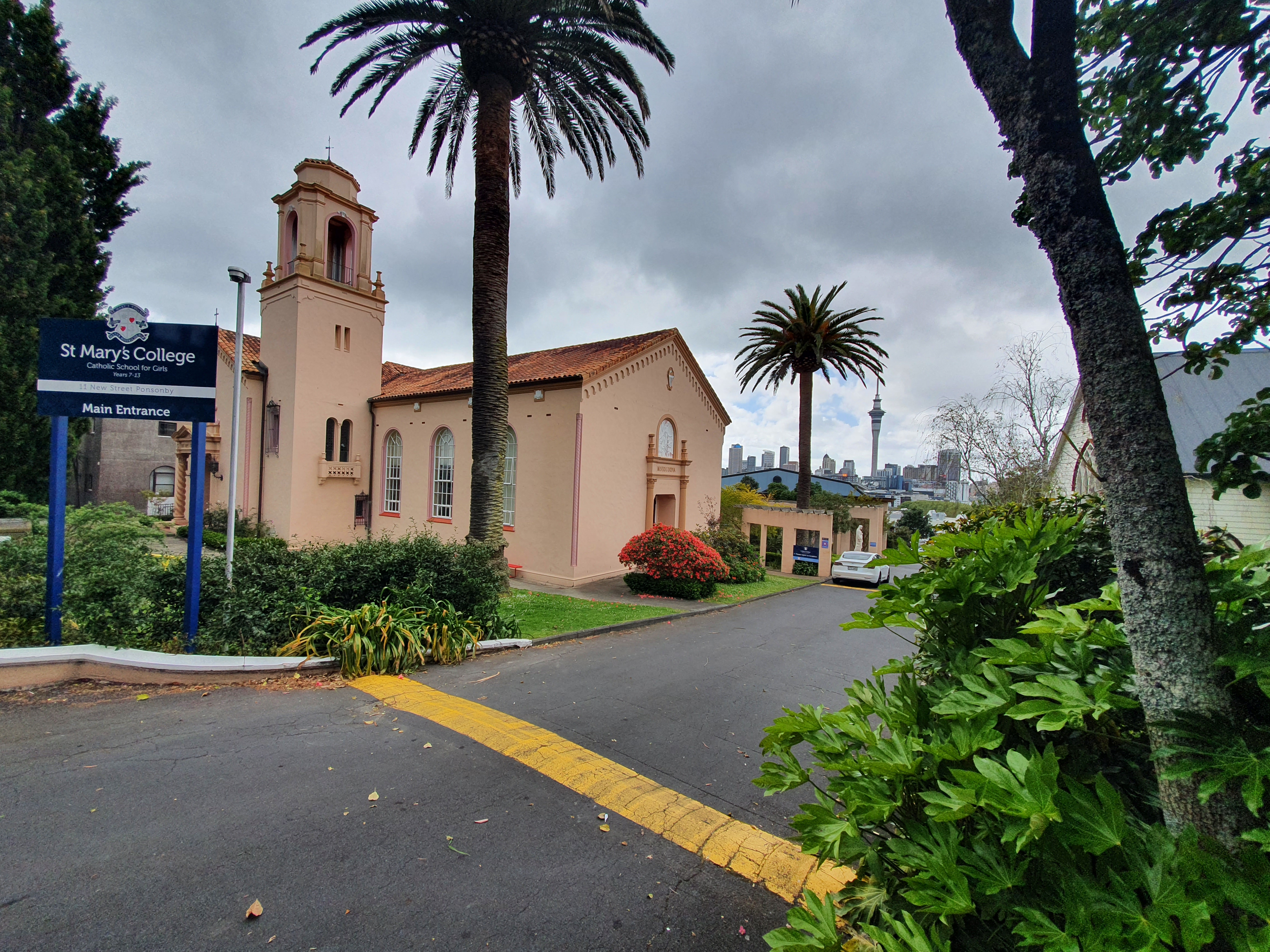

Location
- 11 New Street, Ponsonby; Auckland; New Zealand; 36.8463°S 174.7484°E

Information
- Type: State-integrated secondary
- Motto: Mater Misericordiæ (Mother of mercy)
- Religious affiliation: Roman Catholic
- Established: 1850; 176 years ago
- Ministry of Education Institution no.: 50
- Principal: Sarah Dwan
- Years: 7–13
- Gender: Girls
- Enrolment: 998 (July 2026)
- Socio-economic decile: 8P
- Website: stmaryak.school.nz

St Mary's College is a year 7–13 integrated Catholic girls' high school situated at 11 New Street, Ponsonby, Auckland in New Zealand. It was founded by the Sisters of Mercy in 1850 and is the oldest existing school in central Auckland, and oldest secondary girls school in New Zealand.

== History ==
St Mary's College is the oldest existing secondary school for girls in Auckland and one of the oldest existing schools in New Zealand. It was established in 1850 on the site of the present St Patrick's Cathedral, in Wyndham Street by the Sisters of Mercy, who were founded in Ireland by Catherine McAuley in 1831. The Sisters of Mercy were the first religious sisters to come to New Zealand, arriving in Auckland from Ireland on 9 April 1850.

A large new convent was built in Ponsonby, overlooking the Waitemata Harbour and the central business district of Auckland City and the school was shifted there in 1861.

Its musical tradition goes back to the 1860s. During the 20th Century, under the direction of the late Dame Sister Mary Leo, the school produced many singers of international fame, notably Dame Kiri Te Kanawa and Mina Foley. The school is known for its music with a compulsory music programme running from year 7-9. They have a number of bands which play at festivals all around the world. In 2005 the Sinfonia was invited to play at the Beijing Arts Festival in China. In 2006 the school's band went to Palm Springs, CA for a music festival.

The Mercy character continues to be a dominant focus of the school's ethos. The college is still owned by the Sisters of Mercy who have established a board of directors which works in conjunction with the board of trustees to ensure that the Catholic character of the school is not only maintained but enhanced and promoted.

== Enrolment ==
As of July 2026, the school has a roll of 998 students, of which 123 (12.3%) identify as Māori.

As of 2026, the school has an Equity Index of 388, placing it amongst schools whose students have the fewest socioeconomic barriers to achievement (roughly equivalent to deciles 9 and 10 under the former socio-economic decile system).

== Notable alumnae ==
- Halaevalu Mataʻaho ʻAhomeʻe (1926–2017) – the Queen Consort of Tonga from 1965 to 2006
- Benee (born 2000) – popular singer
- Mina Foley (1930–2007) – coloratura soprano
- Eléna Gee (born 1949) – jeweller
- Jan Hellriegel – singer/songwriter
- Donna Awatere Huata (born 1949) – activist, politician, opera singer
- Claudia Orange (born 1938) – historian (especially of the Treaty of Waitangi)
- Cheryll Sotheran (1945–2017) – founding Chief Executive of the Museum of New Zealand Te Papa Tongarewa
- Leilani Tamu – poet and politician
- Kiri Te Kanawa (born 1944) – internationally acclaimed opera singer

== See also ==
- List of schools in New Zealand

== References/Sources ==
- A.G Butchers, Young New Zealand, Coulls Somerville Wilkie Ltd, Dunedin, 1929.
- E.R. Simmons, In Cruce Salus, A History of the Diocese of Auckland 1848 - 1980, Catholic Publication Centre, Auckland 1982.
- Margaret Lovell-Smith, The Enigma of Sister Mary Leo:, Reed, Auckland, 1998.
- Nicholas Reid, James Michael Liston: A Life, Victoria University Press, Wellington, 2006.
- Jenny Carlyon & Diana Morrow, Urban Village: The Story of Ponsonby, Freemans Bay and St Mary's Bay, Random House, Auckland, 2008.
