= Lexus Song Quest =

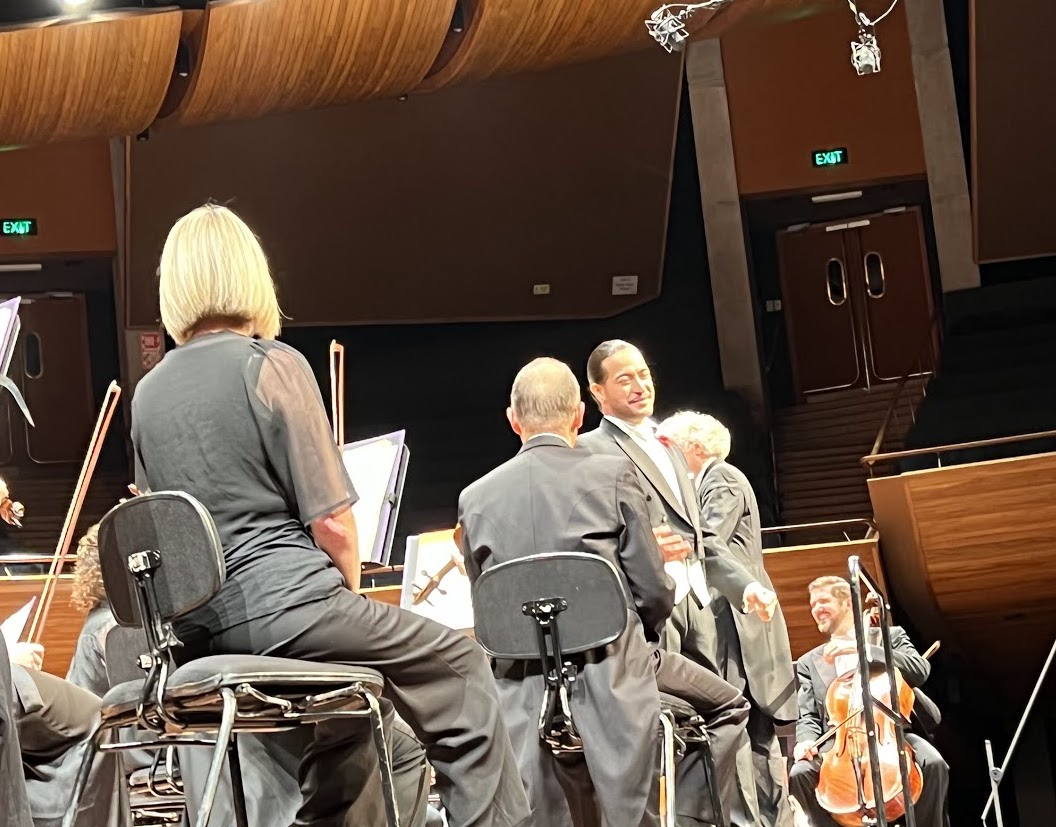
- Filipe Manu competing in the 2022 Lexus Song Quest
- Awarded for: Singing
- Sponsored by: Lexus
- Country: New Zealand
- Presented by: Lexus
- Formerly called: Mobile Song Contest
- Rewards: $20,000 and a Study Scholarship of $27,000, plus economy international travel up to the value of $3000
- First award: 1956; 70 years ago
- Final award: 2024
- Winner(s): Katie Trigg, 2024
- Website: Lexus Song Quest

The Kiri Te Kanawa Song Quest (formerly known as the Lexus Song Quest and Mobil Song Quest) is a biennial opera singing competition, held in New Zealand since 1956. The competition is managed and presented by Tāwhiri, which also runs the New Zealand Festival of the Arts. Winners include the sopranos Dame Malvina Major and Dame Kiri Te Kanawa, both of whom were trained by Dame Sister Mary Leo. Other winners include Phillip Rhodes, Jonathan Lemalu and Sol3 Mio's Amitai Pati.

== History ==
First held in 1956, the Mobil Song Quest began as a radio contest. 1324 entries were made, with contestants recording a song at their local BCNZ radio station. The recorded works were then broadcast in shows over 19 weeks.

Originally the quest featured contestants who performed songs in a variety of styles, such as country and western, pop and classical. Only more recently has the contest been primarily for opera singers, with the influence of Auckland opera singing teacher Dame Sister Mary Leo and the success of her students helping to shape the contest into a more prestigious singing competition.

From its beginning, the Song Quest was sponsored and run by Mobil Oil New Zealand. However, in 2004 the oil company passed the competition on to the New Zealand Festival of the Arts Trust. Mobil withdrew as the naming-rights sponsor, with Lexus stepping in to that role.

In October 2025, Dame Kiri Te Kanawa took over the naming rights of the quest that she won 60 years previously.

The 2026 edition of the Kiri Te Kanawa Song Quest will feature the first time 3 brothers have faced off against each other in the competition. The semi-finals will take place on 4-5 July 2026 where six finalists will be selected to compete in the Grand Final Gala on 11 July 2026.

== Past winners ==
Year	Winner
1956	Donald Jack
1957	Paul Gillmore
1959	Mary O'Brien
1961	Patricia Price
1963	Malvina Major
1965	Kiri Te Kanawa
1967	Anne Rasmussen
1970	Patricia House
1972	Christopher Doig
1974	Christopher Lackner
1977	Lyle Kennaway
1979	Malcolm Smith
1981	Linden Loader
1983	David Griffiths
1985	Robyn Lynch
1987	Deirdre Elliott
1989	Tracey King
1991	Teddy Tahu Rhodes
1993	Martin Snell
1996	Andrea Creighton
1998	Jonathan Lemalu
2000	Jared Holt
2002	Anna Leese
2005	Madeleine Pierard
2007	Phillip Rhodes
2009	Aivale Cole
2012	Amitai Pati
2014	Isabella Moore
2016	Benson Wilson
2018	Joel Amosa
2022	Filipe Manu
2024	Katie Trigg
2026	Samuel Mataele
