= Jacqueline Coats =

New Zealand costume designer

- Citizenship: New Zealand
- Education: MTA (2002) from Victoria University of Wellington & Toi Whakaari New Zealand Drama School
- Occupations: Director of theatre and opera

Jacqueline Coats is a theatre director based in New Zealand who has worked in both opera and children's theatre, she has worked for various organisations including the New Zealand Festival, New Zealand Opera and Victorian Opera (Melbourne).

== Biography ==
Coats is educated from the University of Idaho, and in 2002 graduated with a Master of Theatre Arts in Directing from Victoria University of Wellington and Toi Whakaari: NZ Drama School. She also has a postgraduate diploma in Arts Education Management from the University of Leeds. She was a singer in the New Zealand Youth Choir, and has been an actor and a singer.

She has been directing NZ Opera's touring Opera in Schools programme since 2015.

Children's theatre companies she has worked for include Little Dog Barking, the theatre company of Peter Wilson, Coats took over as director following the death of Wilson in 2021, the company closed in 2025, and Capital E National Theatre for Children. A very popular touring production for children by Capital E that Coats directed is Seasons in 2021 first created by Peter Wilson, Laughton Pattrick (who died in 2020) and Jenny Pattrick in 2000 and Coats was one of the performers. This production honoured the memory of Peter Wilson and Laughton Pattrick.

Coats received the Peter Lees-Jeffries Memorial Scholarship from the Dame Malvina Major Foundation in 2018 for professional development and the Pettman DARE Fellowship at Opera North, University of Leeds in 2019.

In 2020 Coats directed a concert at the Whanganui Royal Opera House in her role as Stagecraft Director with the New Zealand Opera School.

In 2021 Coats directed the Auckland Philharmonia Orchestra's annual Opera in Concert at the Auckland Town Hall.

== Awards ==
1997 - Most Original Production, Chapman Tripp Theatre Awards for Bent by Martin Sherman

2014 - Director of the Year, Dunedin Theatre Awards for This Other Eden.

== Credits ==
Directing credits include:
Date	Title	Form	Production	Cast	Ref.
2009	The Cunning Little Vixen	opera			
2014	This Other Eden	theatre	by Anthony Richie and Michelanne Forster for Opera Otago		
2014	Noye’s Fludde	opera	Produced by New Zealand Opera		
2016	La Traviata	opera	Co-directed with Kate Cherry, produced by New Zealand Opera		
2016	Little Kowhai Tree	theatre	By Peter Wilson, produced by Little Dog Barking Theatre Company		
2017	Songs of the Sea	theatre	By Peter Wilson, produced by Capital E		
2018	La Bohème	opera	By Puccini		
2018	The Two Gentlemen of Verona	theatre	Shakespeare, for Toi Whakaari: NZ Drama School.		
2019	The Barber of Seville	opera	Capital E Festival		
2020	Voices Love Opera	opera	Written by Coats from various operas for Voices New Zealand Chamber Choir	Catrin Johnsson, Albert Mata'afa, Morag Atchison, Andrew Grenon	
2021	Seasons	theatre	Written by Peter Wilson, music by Laughton Pattrick, lyrics by Jenny Pattrick, produced by Capital E	Mia Alonso-Green, Dominic Flanagan, Flora Dryburgh	
