= Glenys Fowles =

Australian opera singer (born 1941)

Glenys Rae Fowles AM (born 4 November 1941) is an Australian operatic soprano who sang with Opera Australia and its predecessors for many years. She also sang at Covent Garden, Glyndebourne, and for the New York City Opera, San Diego Opera, and Scottish Opera. She also appeared at the BBC Proms and with the New York Philharmonic. Her recording with Heather Begg of the "Flower Duet" from Delibes's Lakmé has become famous.

== Early life ==
Fowles was born in Perth, Western Australia, a daughter of Olive Fowles, née Pittard, and C. Fowles. She studied there with Lucy Howell. She appeared as Gretel in Engelbert Humperdinck's Hansel and Gretel in her school's production, at age 12. Her adult debut was as Micaela in Carmen for West Australian Opera. In 1967 she won the vocal section in the ABC Instrumental and Vocal Competition (now known as the ABC Symphony Australia Young Performers Awards). In 1968 she was the first Australian to win a cash prize in the finals of the New York Metropolitan Opera Auditions, when she won the $500 Ludwig Donath Memorial Metropolitan Opera Studio Scholarship.

== Career ==
She trained with the Met for two months, then joined the Elizabethan Theatre Trust Opera, making her debut in 1969 as Oscar in Verdi's Un ballo in maschera. She appeared at Covent Garden in 1973, and as Ilia in Idomeneo in 1974 at Glyndebourne. For Scottish Opera she sang Sophie (Der Rosenkavalier) and Tatiana (Eugene Onegin).

Fowles made New York debut in 1974, as Micaela at New York City Opera (conducted by Christopher Keene), and till 1982 she was a resident lyric soprano there, singing such roles as Poppea (L'incoronazione di Poppea), Mélisande (Pelléas et Mélisande), Mimì (La bohème) and Micaela. She studied with Margarita Meyer in Sydney, Kurt Adler in New York, and Jani Strasser in London.

She sang with San Diego Opera in 1977-1978 (Valencienne in The Merry Widow, opposite Beverly Sills), 1987-88 (Adina in L'elisir d'amore), and 1991-92 (Hanna Glawari in The Merry Widow).

Glenys Fowles's Opera Australia roles include: the title role in Manon, Mimi, Susanna (The Marriage of Figaro), Sophie (1972 to Yvonne Minton's Octavian) and Marschallin (Der Rosenkavalier), Gilda (Rigoletto), Pamina (The Magic Flute), Tatiana, Rosina (The Barber of Seville), Hanna Glawari, Juliet (Roméo et Juliette; in 1983 to Anson Austin's Roméo), Liu (Turandot) and Rosalinde (Die Fledermaus).

The movie Foul Play incorporates some segments of her performance as Yum-Yum in The Mikado.

== Awards and honours ==
In 1986 Fowles was appointed a Member of the Order of Australia (AM) for her services to music.

Her 1978 recording, for EMI, of Valencienne in The Merry Widow (excerpts, in English translation), with Sills, Alan Titus, and Henry Price, conducted by Julius Rudel, won a Grammy Award. "Live From The Sydney Opera House", in which she appears as Mimì in La bohème, won an Emmy Award.

She was an adjudicator for the 2004 Mathy Awards.
