= Live Music Now =

International music charity, based in England

- Formation: 1977; 48 years ago
- Founder: Yehudi Menuhin, Sir Ian Stoutzker
- Type: Charity
- Headquarters: Liverpool, England
- Chairperson: Sir Vernon Ellis
- Website: http://www.livemusicnow.org.uk

Live Music Now is a charity which works with special educational needs providers and care homes to provide live music.

The name Live Music Now covers several connected charities around the world, the first of which was founded in the UK in 1977 by violinist Yehudi Menuhin and Sir Ian Stouzker.

Sir Vernon Ellis has been the chairman since 2018.

== United Kingdom ==
Live Music Now was founded in 1977 in the United Kingdom, by the violinist Yehudi Menuhin and Founder Chairman, Ian Stoutzker CBE. Live Music Now UK has reached 2.8 million people through over 80,000 workshops and interactive performances. In 1984, Live Music Now extended into Scotland, forming a sister organisation, Live Music Now Scotland.

During the COVID-19 pandemic, Live Music Now put together an archive of online musical resources which could be accessed by families, teachers and care home staff to allow children and residents to watch pre-recorded and live-streamed performances remotely.

=== Musicians ===
Live Music Now employs over 350 professional musicians, ranging from performers of Western classical and jazz to those playing traditional instruments such as the West African kora.
