= Heather Begg =

New Zealand opera singer

Dame Isoleen Heather Begg DNZM OBE (1 December 1932 – 12 May 2009) was a New Zealand-born operatic mezzo-soprano who spent most of her career in the United Kingdom and Australia. She was "a versatile artist" with a "gift for comedy", and became renowned as the title role in Bizet's Carmen, Amneris in Verdi's Aida and in lighter operas such as The Gondoliers.

== Biography ==
Born in Nelson, New Zealand in 1932, Begg studied in Auckland with Sister Mary Leo and at the New South Wales State Conservatorium, during which time she won the 1955 Sydney Sun Aria contest. She was engaged as a principal mezzo-soprano with the National Opera of Australia from 1954 to 1956. Her professional debut in 1954 was as Azucena in Verdi's Il trovatore.

She went to London in 1957 to attend the London Opera Centre on a musical scholarship. Between 1959 and 1962 she appeared with the Carl Rosa Opera Company, the New Opera Company, the Royal Opera with whom she made her British debut as Grimgerde in Die Walküre at Covent Garden in 1959. and the English Opera Group in a wide variety of roles. In 1959, she took part in the New Zealand Music Society's concert at the Wigmore Hall, with a performance of Hindemith's The Four Temperaments; the following year Sadler's Wells offered her the part of "Goddess Juno" in Offenbach's Orpheus in the Underworld, where she discovered she had a talent for comic opera. She returned to New Zealand in 1964 to sing with the New Zealand Opera Company until 1966, but still made guest appearances at Bordeaux, Chicago and elsewhere. In the new production of Patience for Sadler's Wells Opera in 1969 as the Lady Jane she played the double bass along with singing.

She was a principal resident mezzo-soprano at the Royal Opera, Covent Garden, where she stayed from 1969 to 1976. Her roles there included Flora in La traviata, Mary in The Flying Dutchman, Emilia in Otello, Mamma Lucia in Cavalleria rusticana, Madame Larina in Eugene Onegin, the Grandmother in Jenůfa, Marthe in Faust, Mrs Sedley in Peter Grimes, Teresa in La sonnambula, Anna in Les Troyens, and Marina Mnishek in Boris Godunov.

In 1975 she appeared as Marcellina in the Chicago Lyric Opera's production of The Marriage of Figaro, which led to her reprising the role in Jean-Pierre Ponnelle's film of the work, where she appeared alongside Mirella Freni as Susanna and Hermann Prey as Figaro. She also appeared in Gilbert and Sullivan at the BBC Proms in 1971 and 1972, also taken part in a concert performance of Peter Grimes (Mrs Sedley) there in 1975. She also appeared as Katisha in The Mikado at The Sydney Opera House with The Australian Opera, a performance issued on video.

In 1976 she accepted an invitation from Richard Bonynge to join the Australian Opera, where she remained for the rest of her career. Here she took on major roles such as Carmen and Amneris, and appeared in Boris Godunov and The Mastersingers of Nuremberg. Her final appearance was at the Sydney Opera House in 2006 to recreate Grandmother Buryjovka in Jenůfa (which she had sung at Covent Garden in 1972 and 1974), conducted by Richard Hickox.

Beyond the UK and Australasia, she appeared on stage with companies in Strasbourg, Bordeaux, Orange, Barcelona, Milan, Chicago, San Francisco, San Diego, and Vancouver.

== Selected discography ==
Her few studio audio recordings include the Queen of the Fairies in the 1962 abridged Iolanthe from Sadler's Wells conducted by Alexander Faris, Anna in Colin Davis's pioneering Les Troyens in 1969, its first complete recording, Marcellina in the 1976 The Marriage of Figaro under Karl Böhm, and she took part in the 1986 recording of Richard Meale's Voss.

On BBC television she was the Duchess of Plaza-Toro in its 1972 Gondoliers broadcast and Katisha in the 1973 Mikado, both conducted by David Lloyd-Jones. The latter role was also set down on video in 1987 for Opera Australia, with Lady Jane in 1995.

Her recording with Glenys Fowles of the "Flower Duet" from Delibes's Lakmé has become famous.

== Marriage ==
She married Johnnie King, a Canadian, in 1964. He died in 1979. They had no children.

== Death ==
On 12 May 2009, Begg died of leukemia, aged 76, in Canterbury Hospital, Campsie, Sydney, where she had made her home for many years.

== Honours ==
Begg was appointed an Officer of the Order of the British Empire in the 1978 New Year Honours and in the 2000 Queen's Birthday Honours became a Distinguished Companion of the New Zealand Order of Merit for services to opera.

In April 2009, a month before her death, Begg's DCNZM was redesignated Dame Companion of the New Zealand Order of Merit (DNZM), after the New Zealand government decided in March 2009 to restore the titles of knights and dames to the honours system. She was the first person to be so designated as her advanced illness caused the change to be gazetted ahead of the planned honours list in August.
