= Conal Coad =

Australian opera singer

Conal Coad is an Australian opera singer known for his dramatic interpretations of the bass repertoire. He was born in Feilding, New Zealand, and resides in Australia (Gold Coast, Queensland)

== Career ==
Coad has performed in many major cities and opera houses around the world including:

- United Kingdom: Royal Opera House Covent Garden London, Opera North, Garsington Opera
- France: Paris, Montpellier, Le Mans, Bordeaux, St Etienne, Nantes, Strasbourg
- Italy: Venice, Naples, Bologna
- Portugal: Lisbon
- Spain: Madrid
- Belgium: La Monnaie Brussels, Vlaamse Opera Antwerp and Ghent, Opéra Royal de Wallonie Liège
- Switzerland: Geneva
- Germany: Hamburg State Opera
- Australia: Opera Australia, Sydney Opera House, Melbourne, West Australian Opera, Perth, Adelaide, Brisbane, Canberra, Tasmania
- New Zealand: Auckland, Wellington and most major centres
- United States: Washington National Opera, Brooklyn Academy of Music
- Israel
- Japan: Shinjuku Bunka Center, Yupouto Hall, Nakano-Zero Hall, New National Theatre Tokyo

He has worked with major world operatic conductors including Richard Bonynge, Simone Young, Richard Hickox, Jeffrey Tate, Ricardo Abbado, Julia Jones, Wyn Davies, Dobbs Franks and Zubin Mehta. As a director, he directed Don Pasquale for The NBR New Zealand Opera in 2006.

On 18 June 2014, Coad performed with Renée Fleming, Haruhisa Handa, and Roberto Abbado at Tokyo Global Concert at the New National Theatre Tokyo in Japan.

== Operas ==
Conal has performed in Le nozze di Figaro, Così fan tutte, Il Seraglio, Die Zauberflöte, Don Giovanni, Don Carlo, Falstaff, I vespri siciliani, Aida, Rigoletto, Billy Budd, Peter Grimes, The Rape of Lucretia, A Midsummer Night's Dream, Let's Make an Opera, Albert Herring, La damnation de Faust, Fidelio, The Barber of Seville, L'heure espagnole, Lucia di Lammermoor, Don Pasquale, L'elisir d'amore, L'italiana in Algeri, Il turco in Italia, The Queen of Spades, La Bohème, Il ritorno d'Ulisse in patria, Norma, Katya Kabanova, Roméo et Juliette, Manon, Mignon, Manon Lescaut, Cendrillon, Fra Diavolo, Der Rosenkavalier, Lulu, Arabella, Ariadne auf Naxos, Capriccio, Lohengrin, Die Walküre, Gianni Schicchi, Die Meistersinger, The Mikado, The Pirates of Penzance, The Bartered Bride.
