= Sister Mary Leo =

New Zealand singing coach (1895–1989)

Dame Sister Mary Leo Niccol DBE (3 April 1895 – 5 May 1989) was a New Zealand religious sister who is best known for training some of the world's finest sopranos, including Mina Foley, Dames Malvina Major, Kiri Te Kanawa, Mona Ross and Heather Begg.

== Biography ==
She was born as Kathleen Agnes Niccol in Auckland and educated by the Sisters of Mercy. She had a talent for music and eventually adopted the vocation of a teacher of music. She took private classes in dancing, elocution, and singing.

She joined the Sisters of Mercy at the age of 28, taking the religious name Sister Mary Leo. She occupied herself in the work of her religious institute in tending to the sick and needy. Sister Mary Leo initially began her teaching career as a violin teacher. She never received formal training in vocal technique. It was in the late 1930s, after she heard a recording of Deanna Durbin and was so taken with Durbin's natural tone, flexible technique, vocal range, and repertoire that included both opera and light music, that she decided to devote her time to teaching singing.

She developed the already strong musical tradition of St Mary's College in Auckland, with its orchestra, choirs, and individual tuition, and also conducted the Sisters' Choir. From 1934, the college offered private tuition, and her reputation as a vocal coach flourished.

From 1950 on, honours and plaudits followed the success of such students as Dame Malvina Major, Dame Kiri Te Kanawa, Dame Heather Begg, Mina Foley, Judith Edwards, Elisabeth Hellawell, Patricia Price, Mona Ross and Elaine Dow; Leo's influence extended into the rock music world with student Jan Hellriegel.

In 1980 the Grand Opera Society of Auckland established the Dame Sister Mary Leo Scholarship in her honour. She was appointed a Member of the Order of the British Empire, for services to music, in the 1963 New Year Honours, and elevated to Dame Commander of the Order of the British Empire in the 1973 Queen's Birthday Honours. She died in 1989, aged 94.
