= Matthew Coad (footballer) =

Footballer (born 1984)

Personal information
- Full name: Matthew Paul Coad
- Date of birth: 25 September 1984 (age 42)
- Place of birth: Darlington, England
- Position: Midfielder

Senior career*
Years	Team	Apps	(Gls)
2003–2005	York City	5	(0)
	Crook Town	?	(?)
?–2011	West Auckland		
2011–2012	Northallerton Town		
2012–?	Newton Aycliffe		
- * Club domestic league appearances and goals

Matthew Paul Coad (born 25 September 1984) is an English former footballer who played professionally with York City in the Third Division, as a midfielder.

== Career ==
Born in Darlington, County Durham, Coad joined York City after being spotted playing Sunday league football by youth coach Brian Neaves. He was given a three-year scholarship in March 2001. He played for the youth team for two seasons and became a regular for the reserves, before making his first team debut in a 3–0 defeat against his hometown club Darlington on 6 December 2003. He was offered a new contract at York in April 2004 following their relegation to the Conference National. He was released by the club in April 2005. He eventually signed for Crook Town and scored for them in a 3–0 victory over Armthorpe Welfare, which saw them progress to the first qualifying round of the FA Cup.

Coad later played for West Auckland Town and joined Northallerton Town in January 2011. He went on to play for Newton Aycliffe.

In January 2019, he was working as a youth coach at Darlington.
