= Vernon Ellis =

British arts governance executive and philanthropist

Sir Vernon Ellis
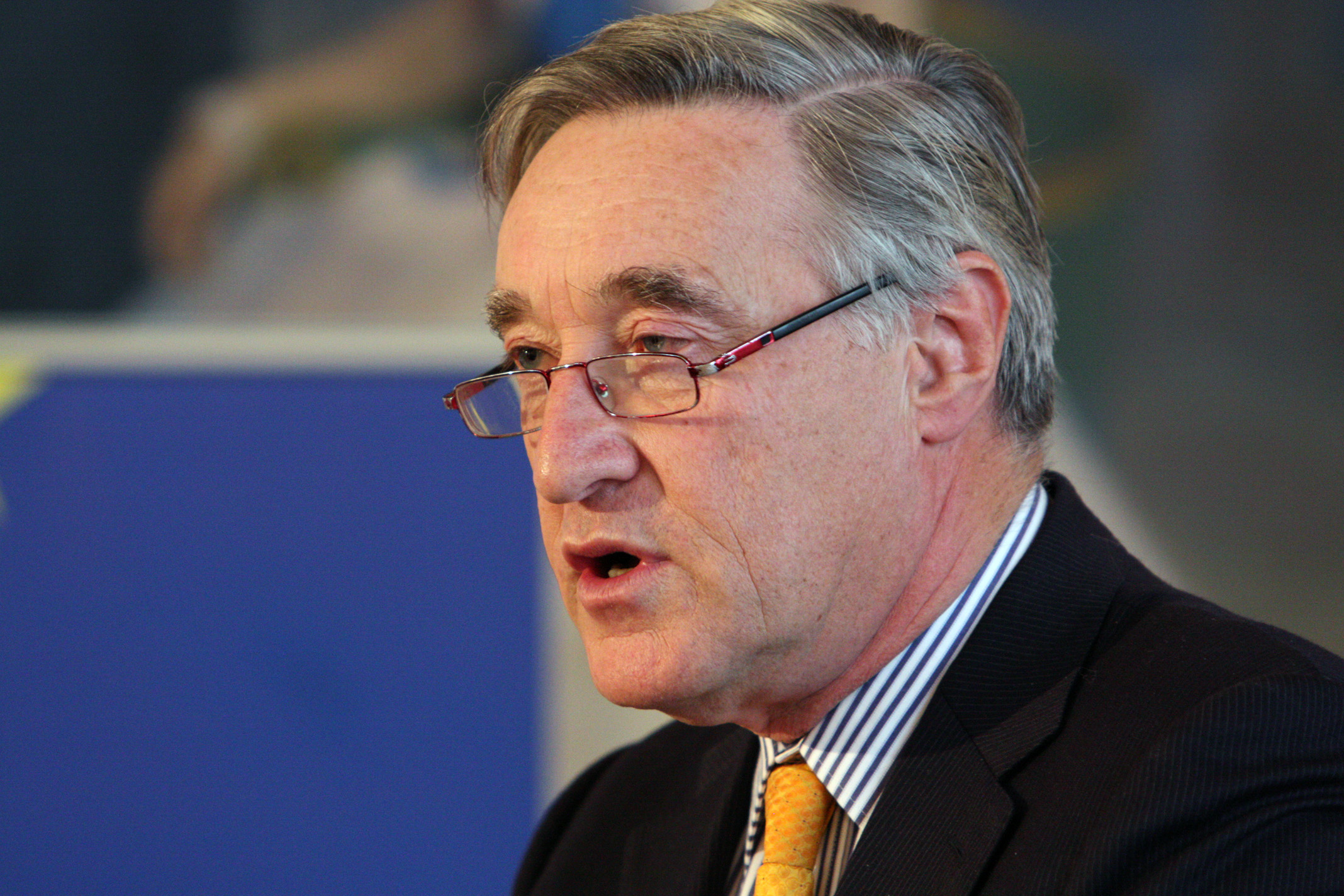

Chair of the British Council
- In office 2010–2016
- Preceded by: The Lord Kinnock
- Succeeded by: Christopher Rodrigues

Personal details
- Born: Vernon James Ellis; 1 July 1947 (age 79)
- Spouse: Hazel Marilyn Lucas (m. 1972)
- Children: One son and one daughter
- Education: Magdalen College, Oxford
- Known for: Accenture; British Council; arts governance and philanthropy

Sir Vernon James Ellis (born 1 July 1947) was the chair of the British Council from 2010 to 2016.

== Education ==
Ellis was educated at Magdalen College School, before going to Magdalen College, Oxford, to study Philosophy, Politics and Economics (PPE). He graduated in 1969 and became a Fellow of the Institute of Chartered Accountants (FCA) in 1973.

== Career ==
Ellis worked at Accenture (formerly Andersen Consulting) from 1969, becoming a Partner in 1979, Managing Partner (UK) 1986–89, Managing Partner EMEAI 1989–2000 and International Chairman 2000–08. He was a Senior Adviser to Accenture 2008–10. Whilst at Accenture, he was involved with business school advisory boards at IMD, INSEAD and Oxford. From 2001 to 2005 he was Chair of the Prince of Wales International Business Leaders Forum; Council, World Economic Forum, 1999–2001; deputy chair, Mayor of Seoul's International Business Advisory Council; UK private sector delegate, G8 Digital Opportunities Task Force, 2000–02.

Ellis was a director of FTI Consulting Inc. 2012-23. He was Chair of One Medical Group 2010 to 2019 and Chair of Martin Randall Travel 2008-24.

In April 2010 he succeeded Lord Kinnock as Chair of the British Council.

== Arts and philanthropy ==
Ellis has been involved in many musical organisations, especially serving as Chairman of English National Opera 2005–12 (President 2012–). He was Chair of Mozartists (formerly Classical Opera) from 1996 to 2009 (currently President); Chair of the National Opera Studio 2012–19; Chair of the Leeds International Piano Competition, succeeding Dame Fanny Waterman, 2015–19; Trustee of the Royal College of Music 2006–10; former Trustee of London Music Masters, Sacconi Trust, the Kathleen Ferrier Award and the Royal Philharmonic Society.

From 2017 he was Chair of the Britten Pears Foundation, and following its merger with Snape Maltings in April 2020, Co-chair of the merged entity – Britten Pears Arts, 2020-23. He currently chairsLive Music Now, which since its formation in 1977 has provided over 80,000 interactive music workshops for over 2.8 million disadvantaged people throughout the UK. From 2012 to 2016, Ellis was Chair of HM Government's Arts and Media Honours Committee.

In 2015, he became the inaugural Chair of the Stop MS Appeal Board, an initiative of the Multiple Sclerosis Society which aimed to raise and succeeded in raising £100m over ten years towards MS research; at the half-way point in 2020 when he retired from this role, the appeal had raised £50m. He has long been interested in ways to increase levels of philanthropy in the UK. He took part in the Philanthropy Review in 2011–12 and was on the Council of the Beacon Collaborative 2018-24. Under its auspices he founded and chaired New Philanthropy for Arts and Culture. In 2024 this merged with Arts and Culture Finance to form Figurative, of which Ellis is a Trustee. In 2025 he was asked to join the Philanthropists Reference Group, formed to give input to the National Strategy for Philanthropy and Charitable Giving.

In 2001 he established the Vernon Ellis Foundation to channel his personal giving, and by 2025 the charity had distributed over £11m. An early major donation provided the lead private support to the restoration of the London Coliseum. The focus now is on the impact that the arts can make on wellbeing, education and the community. Also, through his Foundation, he hosted around 80–90 concerts a year between 2005 and 2017 at his London home in support of musicians' and music organisations' development, and other fundraising events.

== Honours and awards ==
He was knighted for "services to music" in 2011, was awarded Fellowship of the Royal College of Music (FRCM) in 2012; Hon Fellow Trinity Laban Conservatoire, 2011; Hon DLit Goldsmiths, University of London, 2011; Hon DSc Queen's University Belfast, 2012; Hon LLD Warwick University, 2014; Beacon Fellow for Cultural Philanthropy, 2013; Association of British Orchestras Award, 2014; Honorary Bencher of the Middle Temple from 2017.
