= Kathleen Ferrier Award =

Contest for opera singers

The Kathleen Ferrier Award is a contest for opera singers held each April in London, England. The first competition was held in 1956. According to the Telegraph, the competition has a record of "spotting winners".

Originally conceived to offer a prize equivalent to a year's tuition plus support, the competition now offers a first prize of £10,000, a second prize of £5,000 and a Song Prize of £2,500. The competition is open to singers of any nationality who have completed at least one year of study at a UK conservatoire or with a recognised vocal coach in the UK. They must be under 29 years of age at the time of the final audition.

There is also an MBF Accompanist's prize, provided in 2005 by Arthur & Gwyneth Harrison. Pianists competing for the accompanist's award must also be under 29. The first recipient of the award was British-born Barbara Anne Robinson.

The Kathleen Ferrier Memorial Scholarship Fund, which funds the award, was founded in 1953 in memory of Kathleen Ferrier following her untimely death from cancer at the age of 41. Ferrier had gained a large following despite having performed for only 12 years as a professional singer, and had a number of influential champions including conductors Sir John Barbirolli, Bruno Walter and Sir Malcolm Sargent.

The initial appeal for a memorial fund was launched by Sir John Barbirolli, Roy Henderson, Gerald Moore, Sir Malcolm Sargent and Hamish Hamilton and seeded with proceeds from the book Kathleen Ferrier – a Memoir assembled by friends and colleagues.

As of November 2014, the patrons were:

- Sir Thomas Allen CBE
- Sheila Armstrong (singer)
- Valerie Beale (chairman)
- Vernon Ellis
- Catherine Goode
- Sir Nicholas Goodison
- Dr. Linda Hirst
- Graham Johnson OBE
- Yvonne Kenny AM
- Joan Rodgers CBE
- Ian Page
- Nicholas Riddle
- Martin B. M. Williams
