= Kiri Te Kanawa =

New Zealand opera singer (born 1944)

Dame Kiri Te Kanawa ONZ CH DBE AC
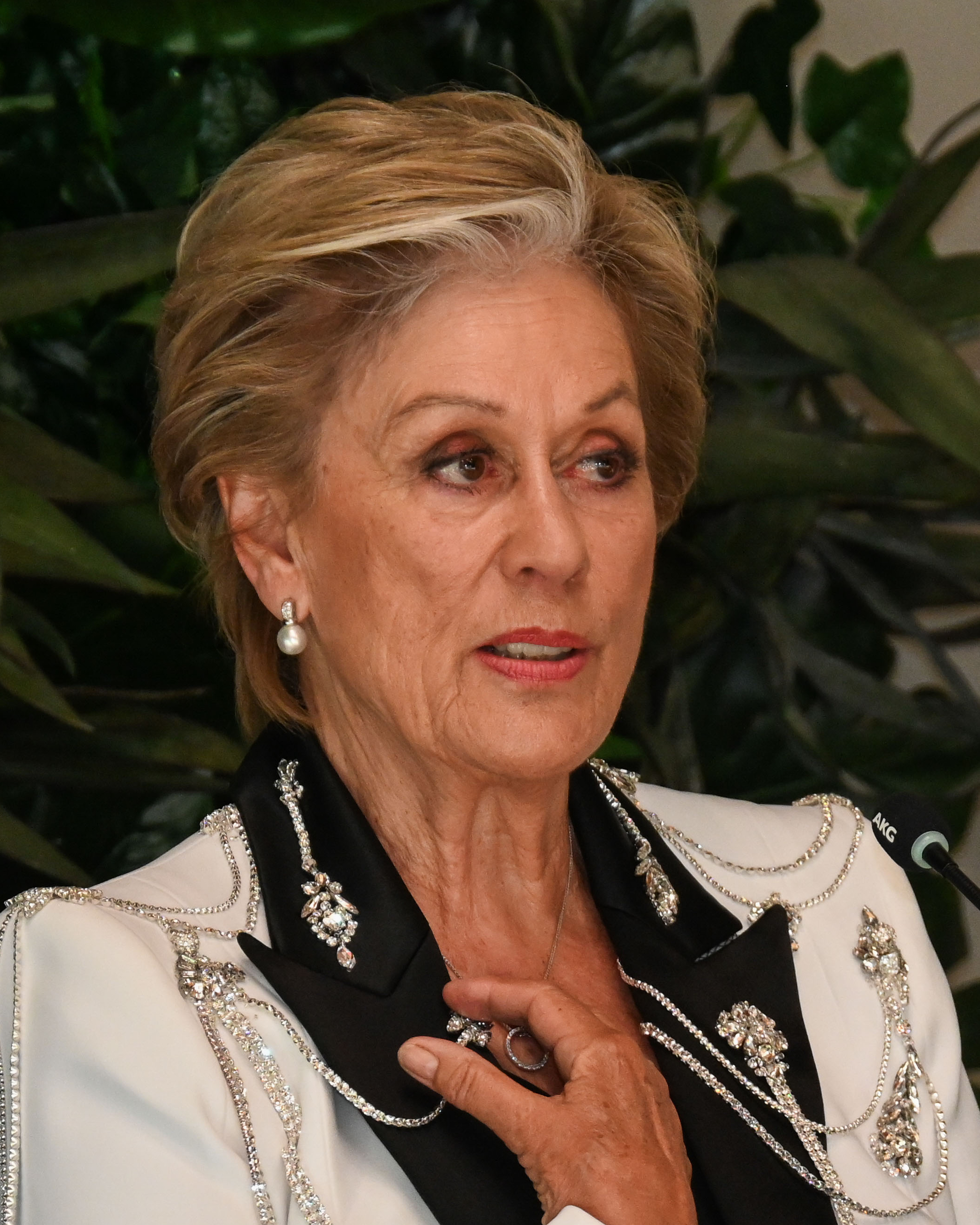
- Te Kanawa in 2024
- Born: Claire Mary Teresa Rawstron; 6 March 1944 (age 82); Gisborne, New Zealand
- Education: St Mary's College, Auckland
- Occupation: Opera singer (soprano)
- Years active: 1968–2017
- Spouse: Desmond Park (m. 1967; div. 1997)
- Children: 2

Dame Kiri Jeanette Claire Te Kanawa (/ˈkɪri təˈkɑːnəwə/; born Claire Mary Teresa Rawstron, 6 March 1944) is a New Zealand opera singer. She has a full lyric soprano voice, which has been described as "mellow yet vibrant, warm, ample and unforced". On 1 December 1971 she was recognised internationally when she appeared as the Countess in Mozart's Le nozze di Figaro at the Royal Opera House in London.

Te Kanawa received accolades in many countries, performing works composed in the 17th, 18th, 19th and 20th centuries and singing in several languages. She was particularly associated with the music of Mozart, Verdi, and Puccini and Richard Strauss, and was often cast as an aristocrat. Her extensive discography includes three albums which featured in the top forty in charts in Australia in the mid-1980s.

Towards the end of her career, Te Kanawa appeared in opera only rarely, preferring to perform in concerts and recitals. She also devoted much of her time to giving masterclasses and supporting young opera singers through the period of their apprenticeship.

== Personal life ==
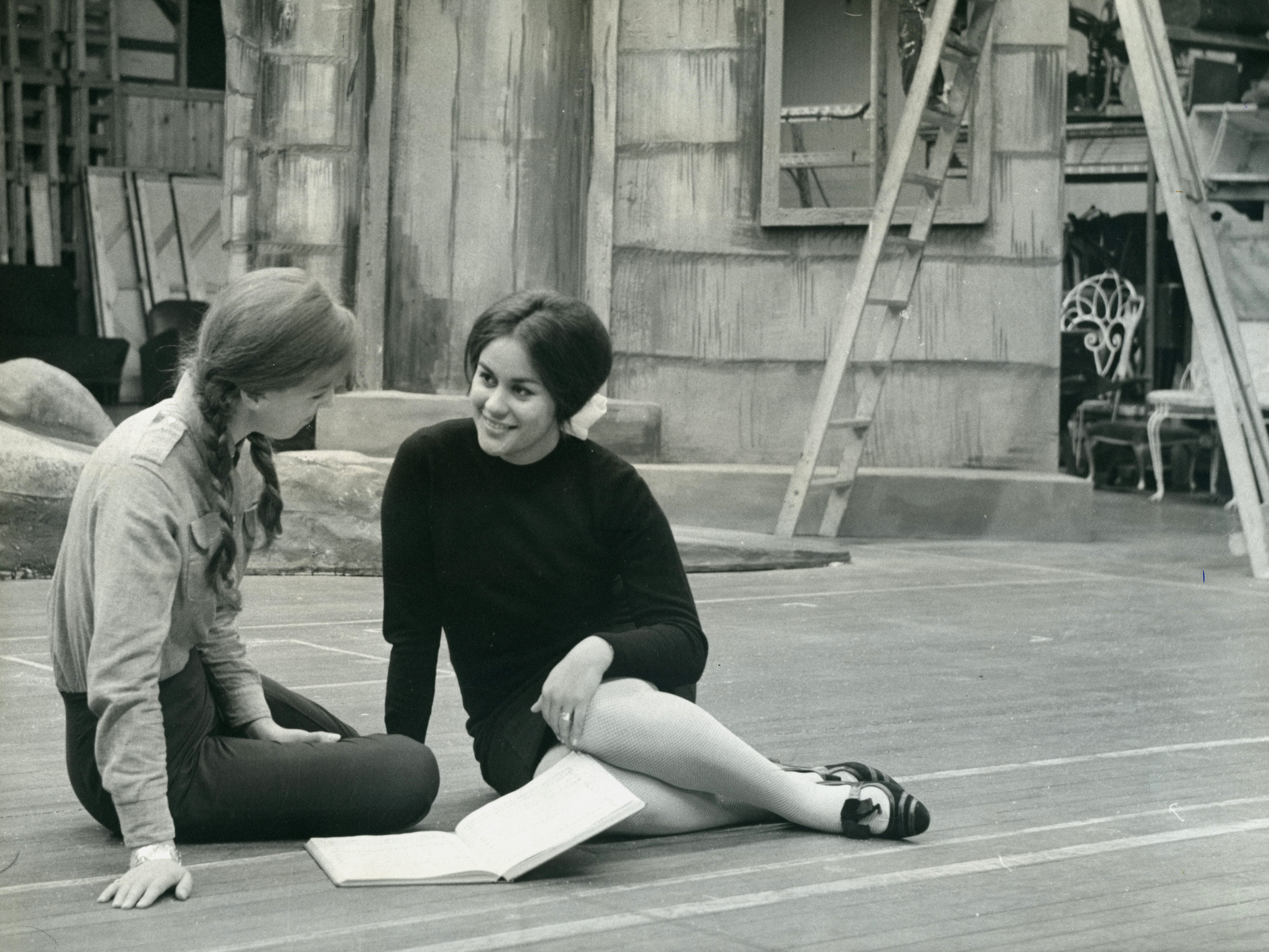
Te Kanawa (right), c. 1960s

Te Kanawa was born Claire Mary Teresa Rawstron in Gisborne, New Zealand, to Māori butcher Tieki "Jack" Wawatai and Mary Noeleen Rawstron, the daughter of Irish immigrants. Wawatai was already married to Apo, the daughter of the Rev. Poihipi Kōhere. Rawstron's mother insisted the baby be given up for adoption. Te Kanawa was adopted as an infant by Thomas Te Kanawa, the owner of a successful trucking business, and his wife Nell. Kiri Te Kanawa's adoptive family is Ngāti Maniapoto.

She was educated at St Mary's College, Auckland, and formally trained in operatic singing by Sister Mary Leo Niccol. Te Kanawa began her singing career as a mezzo-soprano but developed into a soprano. Her recording of the "Nuns' Chorus" from the Benatzky's operetta Casanova was the first gold record produced in New Zealand.

Te Kanawa met Desmond Park on a blind date in London in August 1967, and they married six weeks later at St Patrick's Cathedral, Auckland. They adopted two children, Antonia (born 1976) and Thomas (born 1979). The couple divorced in 1997. Te Kanawa never made an attempt to contact her biological parents, but her half-brother Jim Rawstron contacted her. Initially, she was unwilling to meet him, but agreed to do so in 1997. The episode ended bitterly, when a newspaper ran a story on their meeting; despite Rawstron denying contact with the newspaper, Te Kanawa has since reaffirmed her decision to have nothing to do with her birth family.

== Career ==
In her teens and early 20s, Te Kanawa was a pop star and entertainer at clubs in New Zealand, and regularly appeared in newspapers and magazines. In 1963, she was runner-up to Malvina Major in the Mobil Song Quest with her performance of "Vissi d'arte" from Puccini's Tosca, and in 1965 she won the same competition. As winner, she received a grant to study in London.

She appeared and sang in the 1966 musical comedy film Don't Let It Get You. In 1966, she won the Melbourne Sun-Aria contest, which Major had won the previous year. Both singers had been taught by Sister Mary Leo.

=== Early years in London ===
In 1966, without an audition, she enrolled at the London Opera Centre to study under Vera Rózsa and James Robertson, who reputedly said Te Kanawa lacked a singing technique when she arrived at the school but had a gift for captivating audiences. She first appeared on stage as the Second Lady in Mozart's The Magic Flute. On a recommendation by Richard Bonynge, she changed to soprano training in 1967. When she performed the title role of Purcell's Dido and Aeneas in a concert performance that year, music critic Alan Blyth predicted that she was to be the "opera star of the next decade". In December 1968 she repeated the role at the Sadler's Wells Theatre.

She also performed the title role in Donizetti's Anna Bolena. In 1969, she appeared as Elena in Rossini's La donna del lago at the Camden Festival. Praise for her Idamante in Mozart's Idomeneo led to an offer of a three-year contract as junior principal at the Royal Opera House, where she made her debut as Xenia in Boris Godunov and a Flower Maiden in Wagner's Parsifal in 1970. She was offered the role of the Countess in Mozart's Le nozze di Figaro after an audition of which the conductor, Colin Davis, said, "I couldn't believe my ears. I've taken thousands of auditions, but it was such a fantastically beautiful voice." Under director John Copley, Te Kanawa was carefully coached on the role before a December 1971 opening.

=== International career ===
Meanwhile, word of her success had reached John Crosby at the Santa Fe Opera, a summer opera festival in New Mexico then about to begin its 15th season. He cast her as the Countess in Figaro, which opened on 30 July 1971. The production also featured Frederica von Stade's first appearance in what was to become her signature role, Cherubino. According to a historian of the Santa Fe company, "It was two of the newcomers who left the audience dazzled: Frederica von Stade as Cherubino and Te Kanawa as the Countess. Everyone knew at once that these were brilliant finds. History has confirmed that first impression."

On 1 December 1971 at Covent Garden, Te Kanawa repeated her Santa Fe performance and created an international sensation as the Countess: "with 'Porgi amor' Kiri knocked the place flat." This was followed by performances as the Countess at the Opéra National de Lyon and San Francisco Opera in 1972. She first sang Desdemona in Otello in Glasgow in 1972, while her 1974 Metropolitan Opera (Met) début as Desdemona took place at short notice: she replaced an ill Teresa Stratas at the last minute, and performed alongside Jon Vickers in the title role. Te Kanawa sang at the Glyndebourne Festival in 1973, with further débuts in Paris and (1975), Sydney (1976), Milan (1978), Salzburg (1979), and Vienna (1980). In 1982, she gave her only stage performances as Tosca in Paris. In 1989, she added Elisabeth de Valois in Verdi's Don Carlos to her repertory at Chicago, and, in 1990, the Countess in Capriccio by Richard Strauss, sung first at San Francisco and with equal success at Covent Garden, Glyndebourne and the Met in 1998.

In subsequent years, Te Kanawa performed at the Lyric Opera of Chicago, Paris Opera, Sydney Opera House, the Vienna State Opera, La Scala, Bavarian State Opera in Munich and Cologne Opera, adding to her repertoire the Mozart roles of Donna Elvira in Don Giovanni, Pamina in Die Zauberflöte, and Fiordiligi in Così fan tutte, and Italian roles such as Mimi in Puccini's La bohème. She played Donna Elvira in Joseph Losey's 1979 film adaptation of Don Giovanni. She was seen and heard around the world in 1981 by an estimated 600 million people when she sang Handel's "Let the bright Seraphim" at the wedding of Charles, Prince of Wales, and Lady Diana Spencer.

In 1984, Leonard Bernstein decided to re-record the musical West Side Story, conducting his own music for the first time. Generally known as the "operatic version", it starred Te Kanawa as Maria, José Carreras as Tony, Tatiana Troyanos as Anita, Kurt Ollmann as Riff, and Marilyn Horne as the offstage voice who sings "Somewhere". Te Kanawa was the first of the singers to join the project, saying, "I couldn't believe it...This was music I'd grown up with, music I'd always wanted to sing." The album won a Grammy Award for Best Cast Show Album in 1985, and the recording process was filmed as a documentary, The Making of West Side Story.

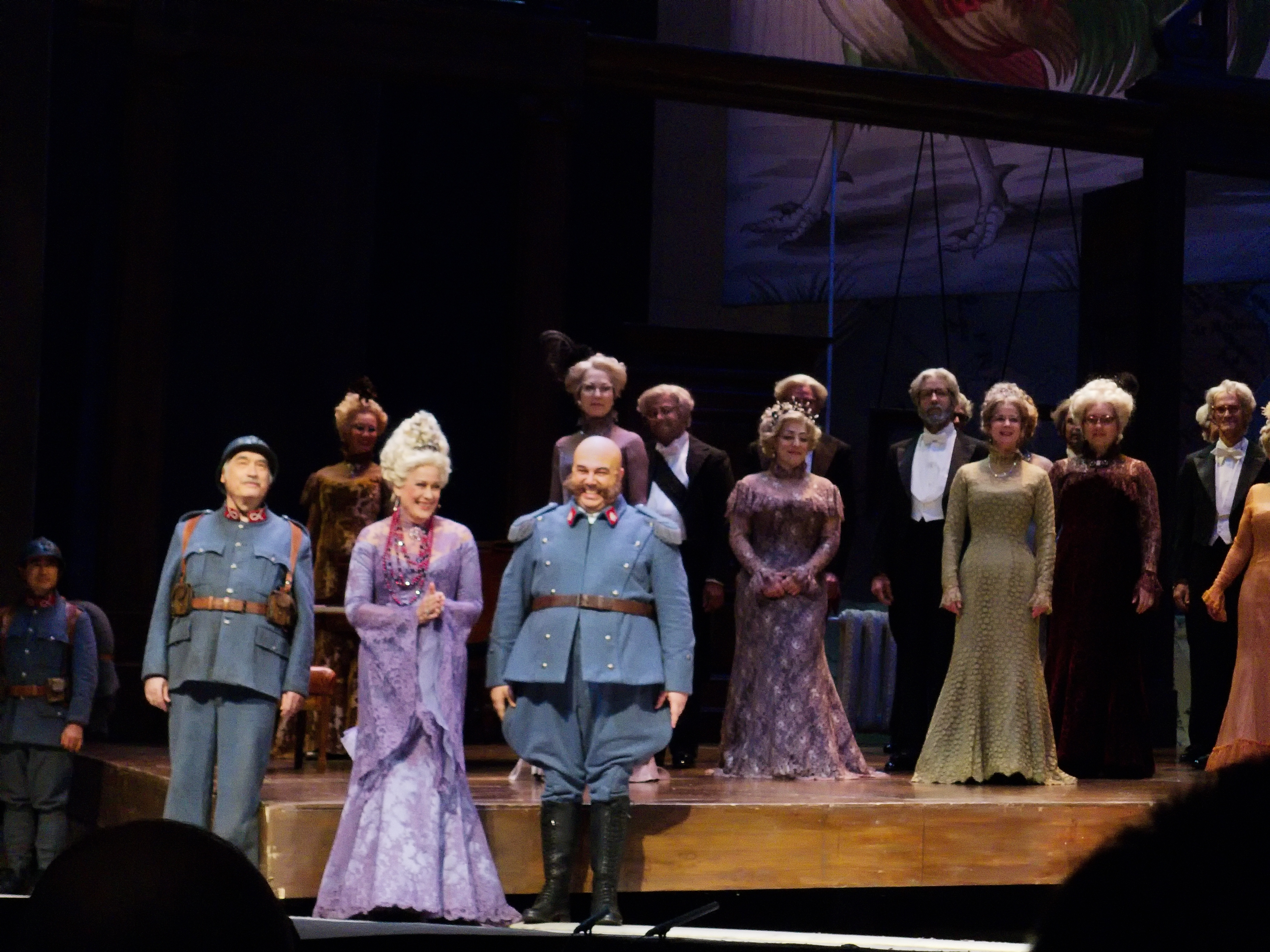
Te Kanawa with the cast of La fille du régiment at the Metropolitan Opera, 24 December 2011

External audio
- Kiri Te Kanawa & Georg Solti performing with the Chicago Symphony Orchestra in "Rejoice Greatly" from George Frideric Handel's "Messiah" in 1984 Here

Te Kanawa has a particular affinity for the heroines of Richard Strauss. Her first appearance in the title role in Arabella was at the Houston Grand Opera in 1977, followed by the roles of the Marschallin in Der Rosenkavalier and the Countess in Capriccio. Many performances were given under the baton of Georg Solti and it was with him that in 1981 she made a recording (Note: Te Kanawa had previously made videos in 1973 and 1975 under Pritchard and Böhm.) of Le nozze di Figaro.

She participated in Prince Edward's 1987 charity television special The Grand Knockout Tournament.

In 1991, she premiered the theme song "World in Union" at the 1991 Rugby World Cup, which reached No.4 on the UK Singles Chart. In 1992, she performed at the Last Night of the Proms, where she sang "Rule, Britannia!".

In 1995, Te Kanawa performed the role of Maria Boccanegra in the Metropolitan Opera's production of Verdi's Simon Boccanegra, alongside Plácido Domingo, conducted by James Levine.

Later in her career, her appearances on stage became infrequent, but she remained busy as a concert singer. She appeared in performances in the title role of Barber's Vanessa in Monte Carlo (televised in 2001), with the Washington National Opera (2002), and the Los Angeles Opera in November to December 2004. Te Kanawa appeared as a Pennington Great Performers series artist with the Baton Rouge Symphony Orchestra in 2004.

In 2006, Te Kanawa sang "Happy Birthday" to Queen Elizabeth followed by "God Save The Queen" at the Commonwealth Games in Australia.

In April 2010, Te Kanawa sang the Marschallin in Der Rosenkavalier in two performances at the Cologne Opera. That same year, she played the spoken role of The Duchess of Krakenthorp in Donizetti's La fille du régiment at the Metropolitan Opera, and sang a tango. She repeated this role at the Met in a revival during the 2011–12 season, repeating it again in Vienna in 2013 and at Covent Garden in March 2014, a run that encompassed her 70th birthday. In the meantime, she performed at Haruhisa Handa's inaugural Tokyo Global Concert at Nakano-Zero Hall in Nakano, Tokyo, Japan, on 10 September 2013. In October 2013 she appeared in the role of Nellie Melba in the television series Downton Abbey.

== Retirement years ==
External audio
- Kiri Te Kanawa with Andrew Davis and the London Symphony Orchestra in Richard Strauss's "Four Last Songs: Im Abendrot" Here on archive.org

On 13 September 2017, Te Kanawa announced her retirement from performing. She then committed herself to nurture young artists, and serving as a judge in several singing competitions. Her final performance was in Ballarat, Australia, in October 2016, but she did not announce her retirement until September 2017.

In 2021, she moved back to New Zealand permanently after having lived in the United Kingdom for 55 years. She was part of the official New Zealand delegation to the state funeral of Queen Elizabeth II.

== Initiatives ==
=== Kiri Te Kanawa Foundation ===
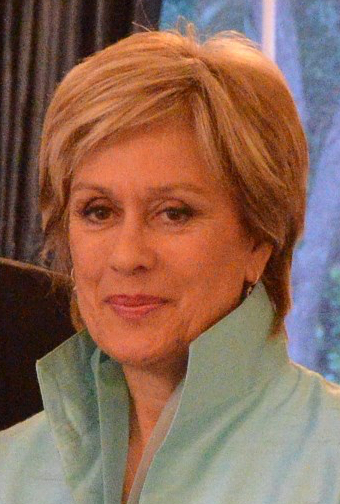
Te Kanawa in 2013

Te Kanawa established the Kiri Te Kanawa Foundation in order that "talented young New Zealand singers and musicians with complete dedication to their art may receive judicious and thoughtful mentoring and support to assist them in realising their dreams." The foundation manages a trust fund that awards scholarships to young New Zealand singers and musicians.

In October 2025 it was announced that the Kiri Te Kanawa Foundation would take over naming rights of the Lexus Song Quest (which she won when it was the Mobil Song Quest). The biennial contest will be known as the Kiri Te Kanawa Song Quest from 2026.

=== Kiri Prize ===
In January 2010, Te Kanawa and BBC Radio 2 launched an initiative to find a gifted opera singer of the future. The initiative was the BBC Radio 2 Kiri Prize competition.

Following regional auditions of over 600 aspiring opera singers, 40 were invited to attend masterclasses in London with Te Kanawa, mezzo-soprano Anne Howells and conductor Robin Stapleton. From these classes 15 singers were selected for the semi-finals, which were broadcast on 5 consecutive weeks on BBC Radio 2's Friday Night Is Music Night. The semi-finalists were accompanied by the BBC Concert Orchestra, conducted by Martin Yates, Richard Balcombe and Roderick Dunk and their performances were judged by Te Kanawa, Howells, Stapleton and director John Cox.

Five singers reached the final, which was broadcast on Radio 2 on 3 September 2010. The winner, soprano Shuna Scott Sendall, performed with Te Kanawa and José Carreras at the BBC Proms in the Park in Hyde Park, London on 11 September 2010, and was given the opportunity to attend a three-week residential course at the Solti Te Kanawa Accademia in Italy.

== Views ==
=== Māori welfare ===
In a 2003 interview with the Melbourne-based Herald Sun, Te Kanawa criticised the high rate of welfare dependence among the Māori people, angering some of her compatriots.

=== Operatic pop ===
Te Kanawa revealed her disapproval of operatic pop singers in The New Zealand Herald's Canvas magazine of 23 February 2008, criticising Hayley Westenra on the eve of her Starlight Symphony concert in the Auckland Domain.

Have you heard Hayley? She's not in my world. She has never been in it at all. She's one of those singers singing today, very successfully [but] they are all fake singers. They sing with a microphone. They are the new fakes for the new generation coming through. But they can only perform with a microphone and they've, basically, never had any formal training. I've had a 40-year career, but these people . . . two or three years and they're gone.

Her comment was met with backlash from music critics and industry personnel, including producer Gray Bartlett, who discovered Westenra, and Katherine Jenkins via her spokesperson.

=== Traditional Latin Mass ===
On 2 July 2024, The Times published a letter to the editor, co-signed by Te Kanawa and numerous other Catholic and non-Catholic public figures, calling upon the Holy See to preserve what they describe as the "magnificent" cultural artifact of the Catholic Church's Traditional Latin Mass.

== Litigation ==
In 2007, the event management company Leading Edge sued Te Kanawa for breach of contract after she cancelled a concert with Australian singer John Farnham. She cancelled after learning that when Farnham was on stage his fans sometimes threw underwear which he would then proudly display. The court found that no contract had been made by the two parties, so Te Kanawa was not liable for damages, but Mittane, the company that employs and manages her, was ordered to reimburse Leading Edge A$130,000 for expenditures already incurred.

== Honours ==
Te Kanawa was appointed an Officer of the Order of the British Empire, for services to music, in the 1973 Queen's Birthday Honours, and was elevated to Dame Commander of the Order of the British Empire, for services to opera, in the 1982 Queen's Birthday Honours. Appointed Officier des Arts et des Lettres by the French Government in 1988, she received the New Zealand 1990 Commemoration Medal, and was appointed to the Order of New Zealand in the 1995 Queen's Birthday Honours. In the 1990 Australia Day Honours, she was appointed an Honorary Companion of the Order of Australia, for services to the arts, particularly opera, and to the community. In 2005, she received an honorary Doctor of Music degree from the University of Bath. She was portrayed as Saint Cecilia on the stained glass window in St Paul's Cathedral, Dunedin, which was unveiled in October 2012.

Appointed a Member of the Order of the Companions of Honour (CH) in the 2018 Birthday Honours for services to music, Dame Kiri was invested by the Prince of Wales at a ceremony at Buckingham Palace on 20 December.

In November 2019, the ASB Theatre in the Aotea Centre was renamed the Kiri Te Kanawa Theatre in acknowledgement of the work she has done on the world stage and to mark her 75th birthday. Te Kanawa unveiled a plaque with the change before a gala held in her honour.

== Awards ==
Te Kanawa was selected as Artist of the Year by Gramophone magazine in 1982. On 10 June 2008 she received the Edison Classical Music Award during the Edison Classical Music Gala (formerly the Grand Gala du Disque) in the Ridderzaal in The Hague. In 2012, Te Kanawa was awarded a World Class New Zealand award in the Iconic New Zealander category.

In 2006, Te Kanawa was awarded the Golden Plate Award of the American Academy of Achievement presented by Awards Council member Dame Julie Andrews during the 2006 International Achievement Summit in Los Angeles.

In 2010, she received the Brit Award for Outstanding Contribution to Music.

== Discography ==
=== Complete works ===
External audio
- Kiri Te Kanawa with Richard Leech, Andre Previn and the Vienna Philharmonic in Johann Strauss II's "Die Fledermaus: Act 1 Trinke, Liebchen" in 1990; Here on archive.org

- 1971 – Verdi – Rigoletto – as Countess Ceprano in a studio recording with the London Symphony Orchestra conducted by Richard Bonynge
- 1972 – Mozart – Exsultate Jubilate – (Exsultate, jubilate, Vesperae solennes de confessore, Kyrie in D minor, Ave verum corpus), Te Kanawa, London Symphony Orchestra and Chorus, Sir Colin Davis [Philips] (also re-issued 1986)
- 1972 – Mozart – Don Giovanni – as Donna Elvira in a studio recording with Covent Garden Royal Opera House Chorus and Orchestra, Colin Davis
- 1972 – Wagner – Parsifal – as a Flowermaiden in a studio recording with the Vienna Orchestra, Sir Georg Solti
- 1973 – Mozart – Great Mass in C minor – Studio recording with Ileana Cotrubas and the New Philharmonia Orchestra conducted by Raymond Leppard
- 1975 – Bizet – Carmen – as Micaëla in a studio recording with the London Philharmonic Orchestra, Georg Solti
- 1976 – Mozart – Le nozze di Figaro – Te Kanawa (Contessa Almaviva), Freni (Susanna), Prey (Figaro), Fischer-Dieskau (Conte Almaviva), Ewing (Cherubino), Begg (Marcellina), Montarsolo (Don Bartolo), Wiener Philharmoniker, conductor Karl Böhm [DVD]
- 1977 – Duruflé – Requiem/"Danse lente" – Te Kanawa, Nimsgern, Ambrosian Singers, Desborough School Choir, Andrew Davis, New Philharmonia Orchestra [CBS Schallplatten GmbH]
- 1977 – Mozart – Così fan tutte – as Fiordiligi in a studio recording under Alain Lombard. For details, see Così fan tutte (Alain Lombard recording).
- 1978 – Humperdinck – Hänsel und Gretel – as the Sandman in a studio recording under Sir John Pritchard. For details, see Hänsel und Gretel (John Pritchard recording).
- 1978 – Mozart – Die Zauberflöte – as Pamina in a studio recording under Alain Lombard
- 1979 – Mozart Don Giovanni (film) French-Italian cinematic adaptation of Mozart’s opera directed by Joseph Losey, with the Lorin Maazel-conducted orchestra and featuring Kiri Te Kanawa as Donna Elvira.
- 1979 – Brahms – A German Requiem – Variations on a Theme By Haydn – Chicago Symphony Orchestra & Chorus, Kiri Te Kanawa, Sir Georg Solti, Bernd Weikl, Margaret Hillis [London Records]
- 1981 – Gay – The Beggar's Opera – as Polly Peachum in a studio recording with National Philharmonic Orchestra, Richard Bonynge
- 1981 – Mozart – Le nozze di Figaro – as Contessa Almaviva in a studio recording with London Philharmonic Orchestra, Georg Solti. For details, see Le nozze di Figaro (Georg Solti recording).
- 1981 – Puccini – La rondine – as Magda de Civry in a studio recording with the London Symphony Orchestra, Lorin Maazel
- 1984 – Puccini – Tosca – as Floria Tosca in a studio recording under Georg Solti
- 1985 – Handel – Messiah – with Anne Gjevang, Keith Lewis, Gwynne Howell, Chicago Symphony Orchestra & Chorus, Sir Georg Solti [3xLP, Album + Box, London Records]
- 1985 – Leonard Bernstein – West Side Story – a recording of Bernstein's music for the Broadway production West Side Story, with José Carreras singing the part of Tony and Leonard Bernstein conducting the orchestra and chorus [Polygram 415253]
- 1986 – Richard Strauss – Arabella – as Arabella in a studio recording with Covent Garden Royal Opera House Chorus and Orchestra, Jeffrey Tate
- 1986 – Gounod – Faust – sang the role of Marguerite in a studio recording with the Bavarian Radio Symphony Orchestra and Chorus, Colin Davis
- 1986 – Rodgers and Hammerstein – South Pacific – London Studio Cast, Kiri Te Kanawa, Mandy Patinkin, José Carreras and Sarah Vaughan – AUS No. 32
- 1987 – Puccini – Manon Lescaut – sang the title role in a studio recording with Teatro Comunale di Bologna, Riccardo Chailly
- 1987 – Alan Jay Lerner and Frederick 'Fritz' Loewe – My Fair Lady – a studio cast recording with Te Kanawa singing the role of Eliza Doolittle and Jeremy Irons singing the role of Henry Higgins [Polygram 421200]
- 1987 – Beethoven – Symphonie No.9 – Te Kanawa, Hamari, Burrows, Holl, London Symphony Chorus, London Symphony Orchestra, Eugen Jochum [EMI]
- 1988 – Mozart – Così fan tutte – recorded the role of Fiordiligi again this time with Vienna State Opera, James Levine
- 1988 – Bach – St Matthew Passion – Te Kanawa, von Otter, Rolfe Johnson, Krause, Blochwitz, Bär, Chicago Symphony Orchestra, Sir Georg Solti [Box, Album + 3xCD, Decca]
- 1988 – Fauré – Requiem · Pelléas Et Mélisande · Pavane – Te Kanawa, Milnes, Choeur De L'Orchestre Symphonique De Montreal, Orchestre Symphonique De Montréal, Charles Dutoit [Decca]
- 1989 – Verdi – Simon Boccanegra – in the role of Amelia Grimaldi in a studio recording with La Scala, Milan, Georg Solti
- 1989 – Mozart – Die Zauberflöte – recorded the role of Pamina again this time with Neville Marriner and the Academy of St. Martin in the Fields
- 1990 – Johann Strauss II – Die Fledermaus – sang the part of Rosalinde with Vienna State Opera, André Previn
- 1990 – Mozart – Le nozze di Figaro – re-recorded the role of Contessa Almaviva in a studio recording with the Metropolitan Opera, James Levine
- 1990 – Richard Strauss – Der Rosenkavalier – sang the role of the Marschallin with the Semperoper Dresden under Bernard Haitink
- 1990 – Mozart – Der Schauspieldirector – sang the role of Mademoiselle Silberklang with the Vienna Philharmonic under John Pritchard
- 1992 – Tchaikovsky – Eugene Onegin – sang the role of Tatyana in a studio recording with Welsh National Opera under Charles Mackerras
- 1992 – Verdi – La traviata – sang the role of Violetta in a studio recording with the Maggio Musicale Fiorentino, Zubin Mehta
- 1992 – Mahler – Symphony No. 4 – Kiri Te Kanawa, Chicago Symphony Orchestra, Georg Solti [Decca]
- 1993 – Wagner – Tannhäuser – sang the role of Elisabeth in a studio recording with the London Philharmonia Orchestra and the Ambrosian Singers, Marek Janowski
- 1994 – Mozart – Great Mass in C minor – (chorus master: László Heltay) [Philips]
- 1994 – Puccini – La bohème – recorded the role of Mimì in a studio recording with the London Symphony Orchestra, Kent Nagano
- 1996 – Richard Strauss – Capriccio – recorded the role of the Countess in a studio recording with Wiener Philharmoniker, Ulf Schirmer, Decca/London
- 1998 – Bizet – Carmen – Highlights – Troyanos, Domingo, Te Kanawa, London Philharmonic Orchestra, Georg Solti [Decca]

=== Solo recitals, compilations, etc. ===
- 1973 – My Favourite Things [Hallmark, SHM 3218]
- 1974 – Herrmann – Salammbo's Aria from Citizen Kane – The Classic Film Scores of Bernard Herrmann – Kiri Te Kanawa, National Philharmonic Orchestra, Charles Gerhardt [RCA Victor, BMG Classics]
- 1979 – Richard Strauss – Four Last Songs – London Symphony Orchestra, Andrew Davis [CBS Masterworks]
- 1981 – Mozart Concert Arias – Kiri Te Kanawa, Wiener Kammerorchester, Gyorgy Fischer [London/Decca Jubilee 417756]
- 1983 – Canteloube – Chants d'Auvergne (Songs of The Auvergne) / Villa-Lobos – Bachianas Brasileiras [Polygram SXDL 7604]
- 1983 – Mozart Opera Arias – London Symphony Orchestra, Sir Colin Davis [Philips], [Polygram 5414319]
- 1983 – Verdi & Puccini – London Philharmonic Orchestra, John Pritchard [CBS 37298]
- 1983 – The Metropolitan Opera Centennial Gala – Metropolitan Opera Orchestra, James Levine [Deutsche Grammophon DVD 00440 073 4538]
- 1984 – Come to the Fair – Folk Songs & Ballads – with the Medici String Quartet and members of the National Philharmonic Orchestra, Douglas Gamley [EMI EMC 222]
- 1984 – Ave Maria – a collection of religious favourites with the English Chamber Orchestra and the Choir of St. Paul's Cathedral, London [Philips 412629]
- 1984 – A Portrait of Kiri Te Kanawa [CBS SBR 236068]
- 1985 – A Room with a View (OST) – the Puccini arias "O mio babbino caro" (Gianni Schicchi) and "Chi bel sogno di Doretta" (La Rondine) in the Merchant Ivory film A Room with a View [DRG CDSBL 12588]
- 1986 – Kiri – Blue Skies – with Nelson Riddle And His Orchestra [Polygram/Decca 414 666–1 ] – AUS No. 36
- 1986 – Christmas with Kiri (with Philharmonia Orchestra of London and Chorus, Carl Davis) London Classic / Polygram
- 1987 – Kiri Sings Gershwin, a collection of George Gershwin songs with the New Princess Theater Orchestra, John McGlinn [EMI] – AUS No. 37
- 1987 – Portrait [Polygram 417645]
- 1989 – Songs of Inspiration – Kiri Te Kanawa, Mormon Tabernacle Choir, Utah Symphony Orchestra, Julius Rudel [London/Decca/Polygram 425431]
- 1990 – Kiri in Recital – Liszt, Obradors, Ravel – Kiri Te Kanawa, with Roger Vignoles (Piano) [London/Decca 425820 ]
- 1990 – Italian Opera Arias – with London Symphony Orchestra, Myung-Whun Chung
- 1991 – Richard Strauss – Four Last Songs and other songs – with Georg Solti and the Vienna Philharmonic
- 1991 – The Kiri Selection
- 1991 – Kiri Sings Kern
- 1991 – World in Union (Single, 7") – (Rugby World Cup Theme Song) [Columbia]
- 1992 – Paul McCartney and Carl Davis – Paul McCartney's Liverpool Oratorio (Movement VII: "Crises")
- 1992 – Kiri Sidetracks: The Jazz Album
- 1993 – Mozart Arias (Grand Voci) [Decca]
- 1993 – Classics – Mozart, Handel, Gounod, Schubet, Strauss [Philips 434725]
- 1994 – Heart to Heart (with Malcolm McNeill)
- 1994 – The Sorceress – arias from Handel operas with Hogwood and The Academy of Ancient Music
- 1994 – Kiri!: Her Greatest Hits Live [Decca 443600]
- 1994 – Kiri Sings Porter – Cole Porter songs [Angel]
- 1995 – Christmas with Kiri Te Kanawa: Carols from Coventry Cathedral – Kiri Te Kanawa, Michael George, BBC Philharmonic Orchestra, Robin Stapleton [Teldec]
- 1996 – Franz Schubert – Lieder – Judith Raskin, Kiri Te Kanawa, Elly Ameling, Peter Pears, Judith Blegen [Sony Classical]
- 1996 – James Levine's 25th Anniversary Metropolitan Opera Gala, [Deutsche Grammophon DVD, B0004602-09]
- 1997 – French Songs and Arias
- 1997 – Sole et amore – Puccini Arias – Te Kanawa, Vignoles, Orchestre de L'Opera National de Lyon, Kent Nagano [Erato]
- 1998 – The Greatest Classical Stars on Earth – Plácido Domingo, Kiri Te Kanawa, Luciano Pavarotti, Lesley Garrett, Nigel Kennedy (2CD, Compilation) [Decca]
- 1999 – Maori Songs (Air New Zealand) [EMI Classics 5 56828-2]
- 1999 – Greatest Hits [EMI Classics]
- 2001 – Kiri (also known as Kiri – The Best Of)
- 2003 – The Very Best Of
- 2004 – Kiri – A Portrait
- 2004 – Dame Kiri Te Kanawa & Friends: The Gala Concert – Gold
- 2005 – The Best of Kiri Te Kanawa [20th Century Masters – The Millennium Collection]
- 2006 – Kiri Sings Karl: Songs of Mystery & Enchantment – arranged and conducted by Karl Jenkins [EMI Classics]
- 2013 – Waiata Sony Music Entertainment
