= 2022 Birthday Honours (New Zealand) =

Awards list for New Zealand

2022 Queen's Birthday and Platinum Jubilee Honours
- Previous: 2022 New Year Honours; Next: 2022 Special Honours
- Type: New Zealand royal honours: Order of New Zealand; New Zealand Order of Merit; Queen's Service Order; Queen's Service Medal; New Zealand Antarctic Medal
- Date: 6 June 2022
- Country: New Zealand
- Total recipients: 187

The 2022 Queen's Birthday and Platinum Jubilee Honours in New Zealand, celebrating the official birthday and Platinum Jubilee of Queen Elizabeth II, were appointments made by the Queen in her right as Queen of New Zealand, on the advice of the New Zealand government, to various orders and honours to reward and highlight good works by New Zealanders. They were announced on 6 June 2022.

The recipients of honours are listed here as they were styled before their new honour.

== Order of New Zealand (ONZ) ==
Additional member

- Dame Silvia Rose Cartwright PCNZM DBE QSO DStJ – of Epsom. For services to New Zealand.
- Sir Stephen (Tipene) Gerard O'Regan – of New Brighton. For services to New Zealand.
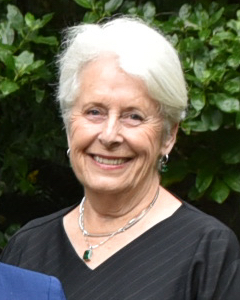
Dame Silvia Cartwright

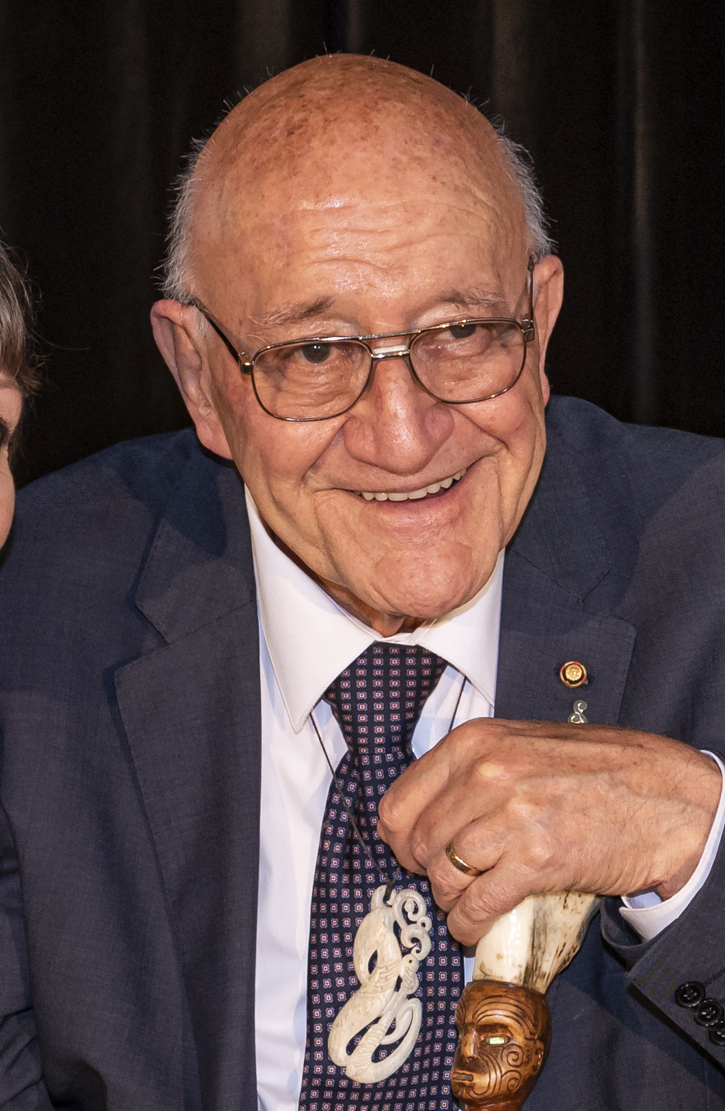
Sir Tipene O'Regan

== New Zealand Order of Merit ==
=== Dame Companion (DNZM) ===
- Ruth Ellina Aitken ONZM – of Paeroa. For services to netball.
- Judge Carolyn Henwood CNZM – of Wadestown. For services to the State, youth and the arts.
- Dr Judith Helen McGregor CNZM – of Devonport. For services to human rights and health.
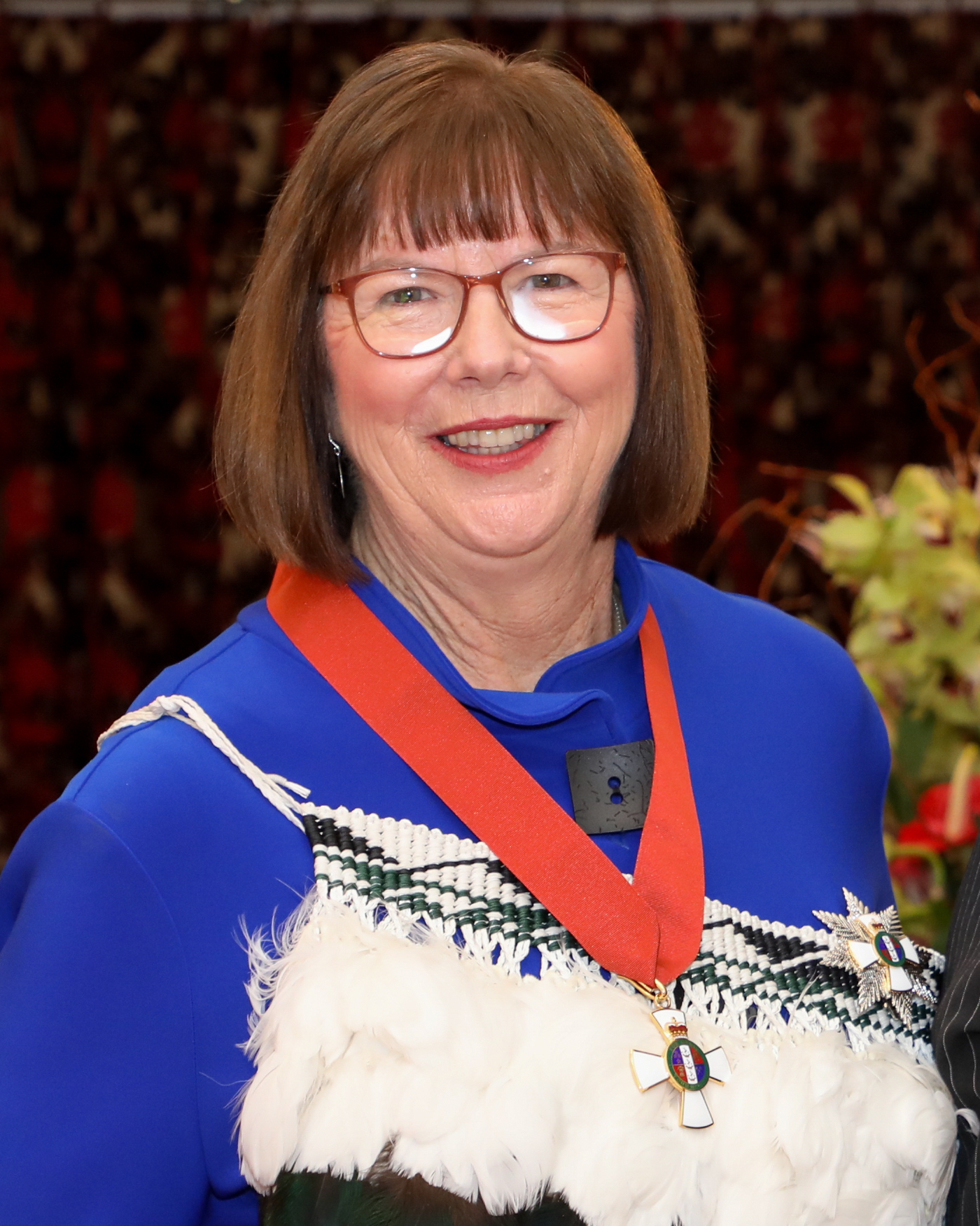
Dame Ruth Aitken

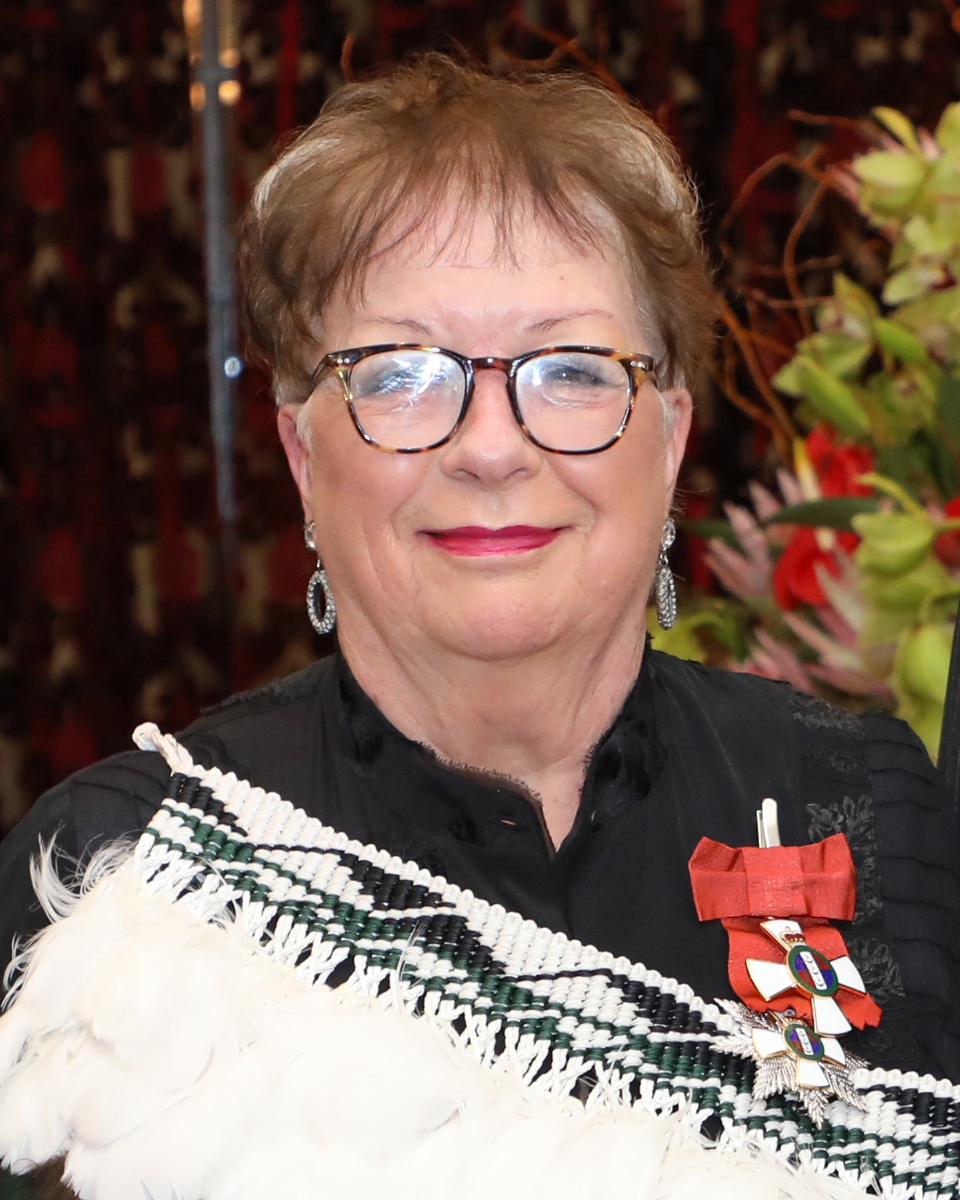
Dame Carolyn Henwood

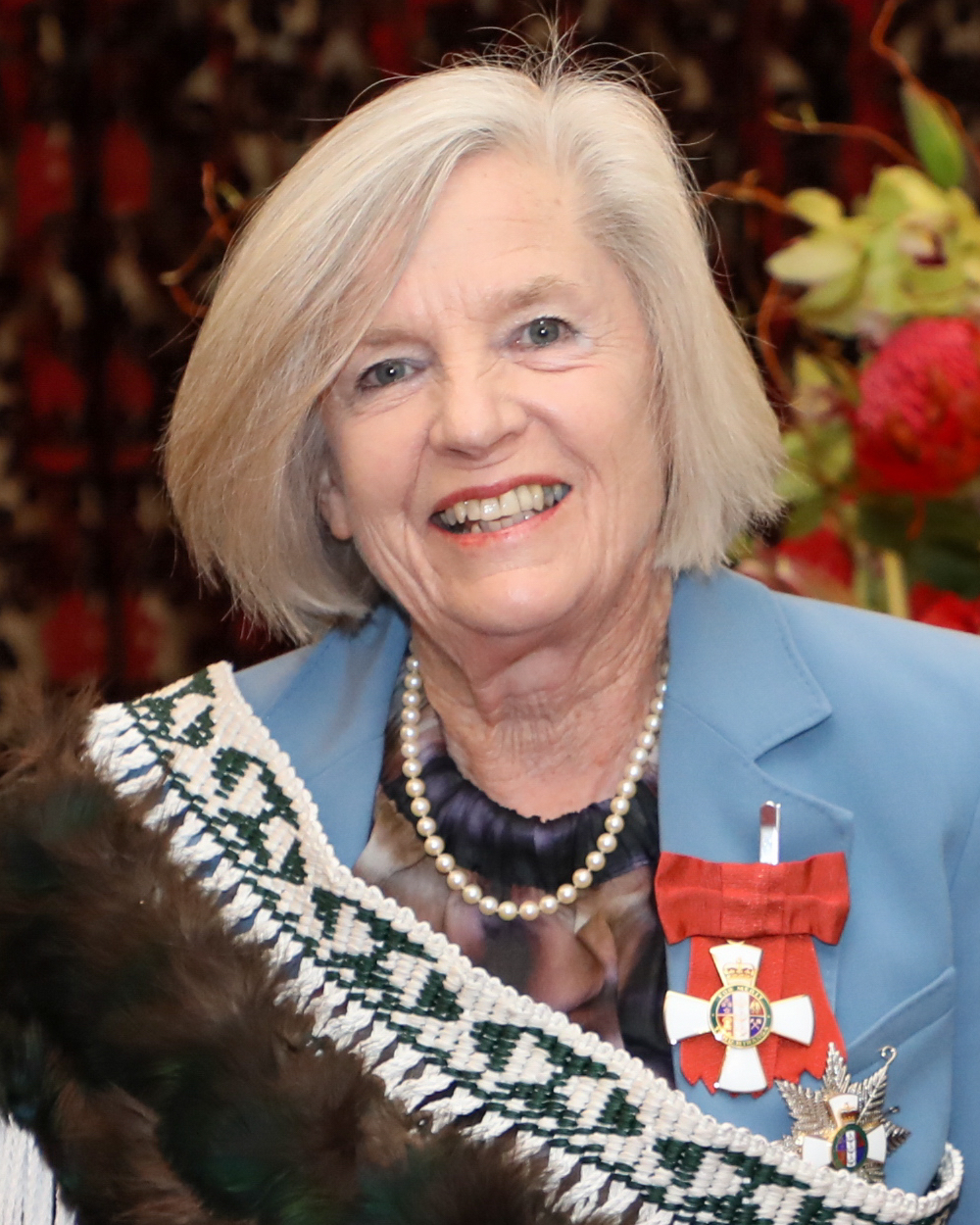
Dame Judy McGregor

=== Knight Companion (KNZM) ===
- Dr Patrick Wahanga Hohepa – of Kaikohe. For services to Māori culture and education.
- Heughan Bassett Rennie CBE QC – of Thorndon. For services to governance, the law, business and the community.
- Dr Collin Fonotau Tukuitonga – of Wellsford. For services to Pacific and public health.
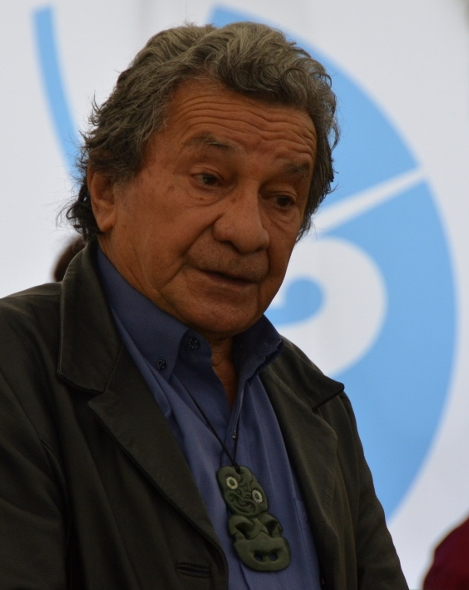
Sir Patu Hohepa

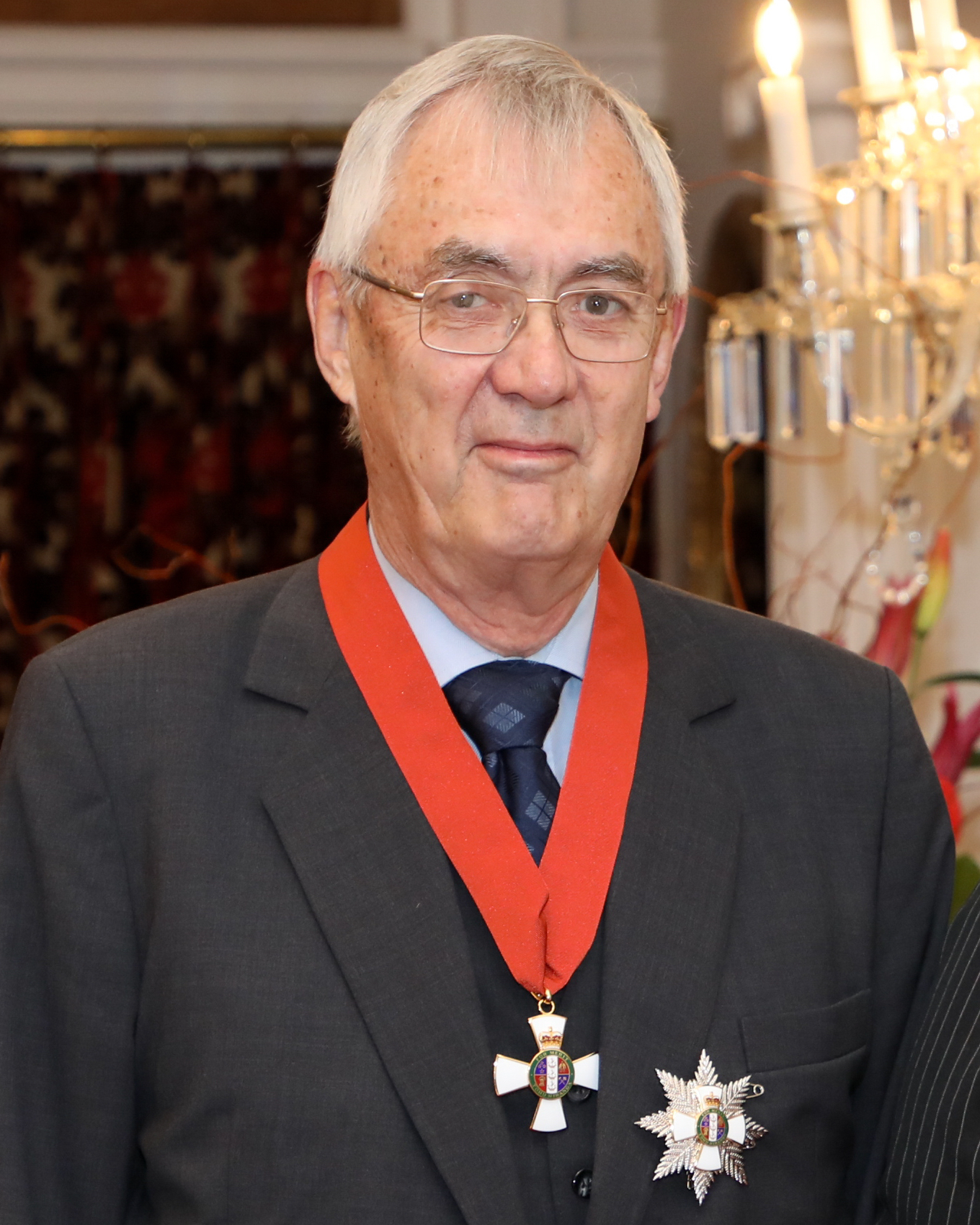
Sir Hugh Rennie

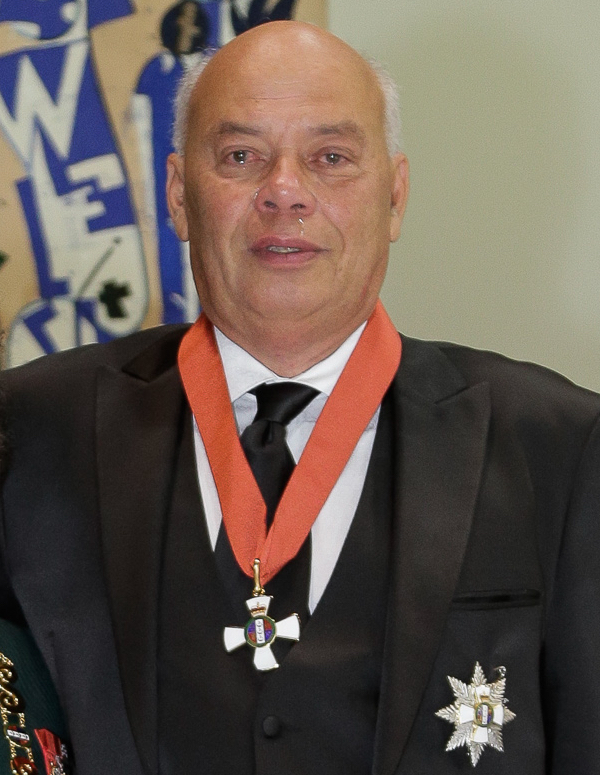
Sir Collin Tukuitonga

=== Companion (CNZM) ===
- Dr Alastair MacCormick – of Remuera, for services to tertiary education and the community.
- Edward Colin Manson ONZM – of Saint Heliers. For services to philanthropy, urban development and business.
- Benjamin Quentin Marshall – of Canada Bay, New South Wales. For services to rugby league.
- John Anthony Monaghan – of Martinborough. For services to the dairy industry.
- Lisa Marie Reihana MNZM – of Freemans Bay. For services to the arts.
- Dr Miriam Edna Saphira – of Matatoki. For services to the LGBTQIA+ community.
- Luteru Ross Poutoa Lote Taylor – of Hamilton. For services to cricket and Pacific communities.
- Dr David Graeme Woodfield – of Tamahere. For services to transfusion medicine.
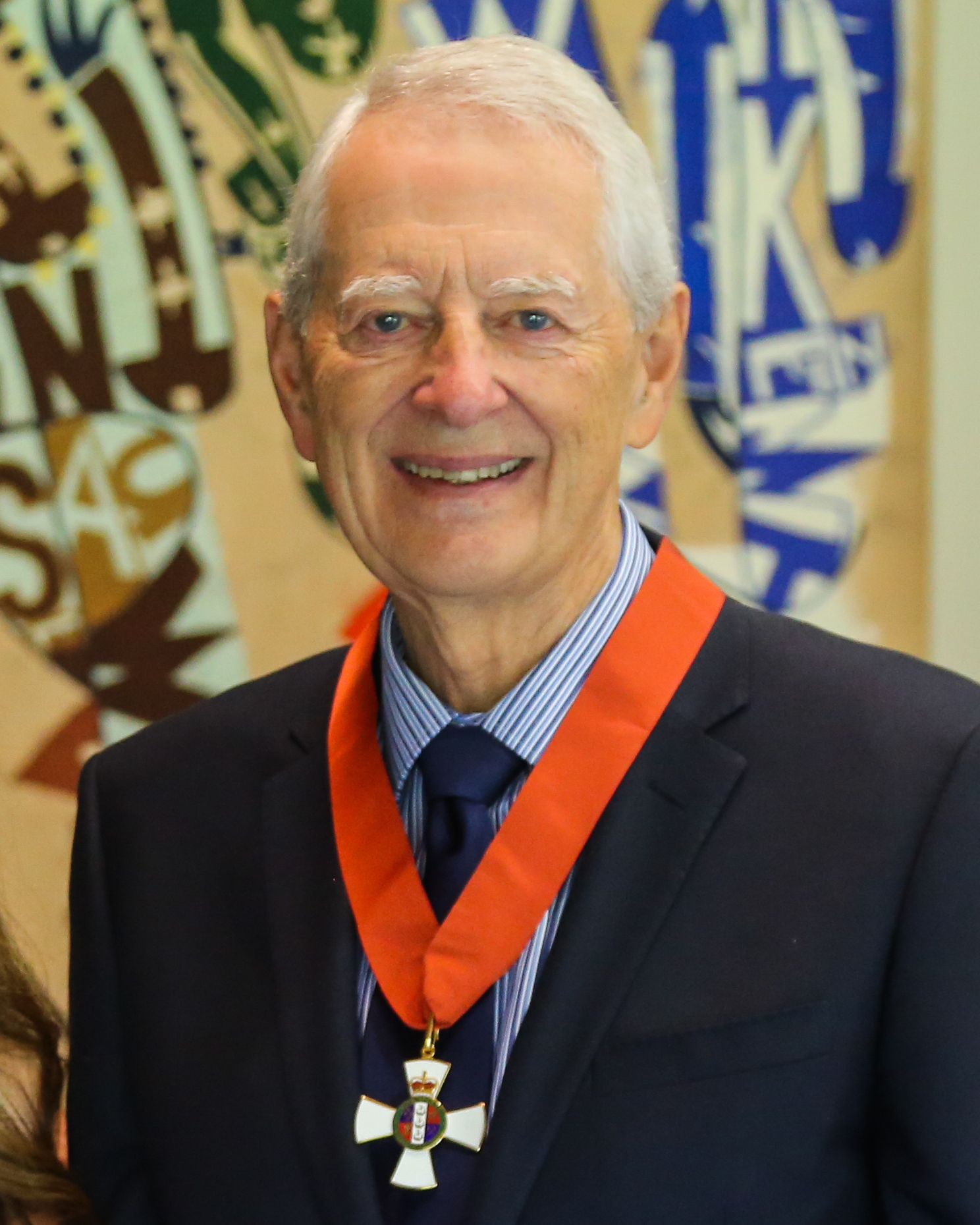
Alastair MacCormick

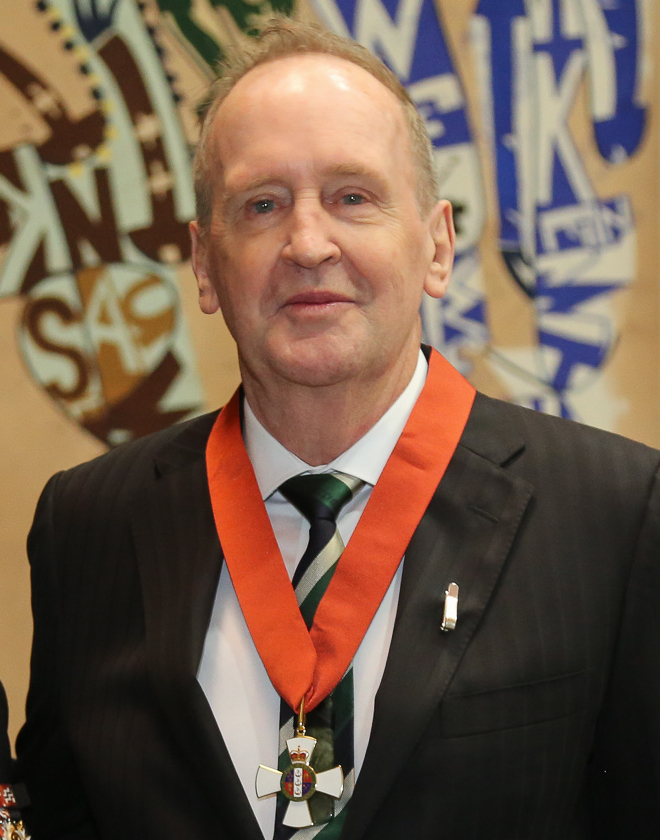
Ted Manson

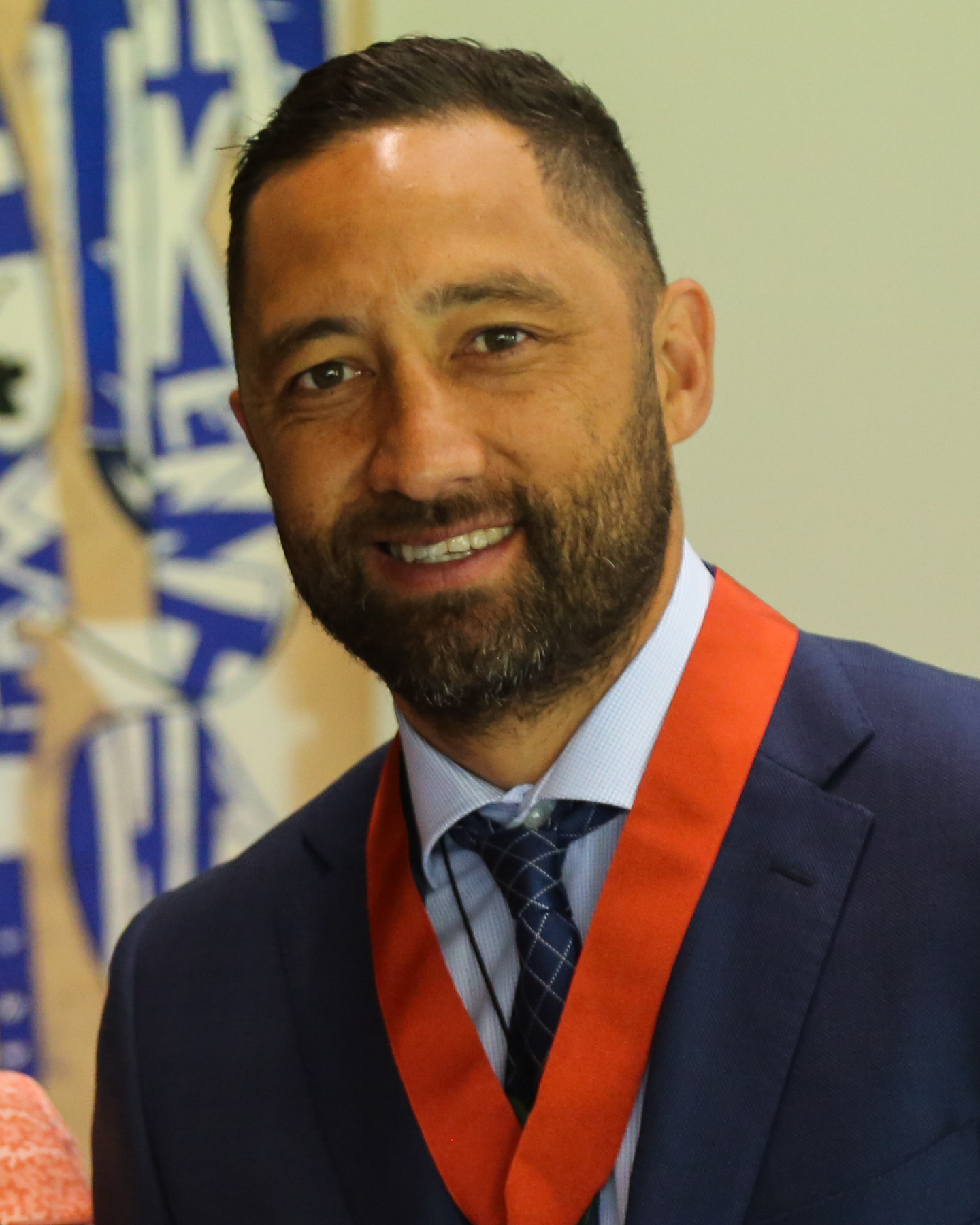
Benji Marshall

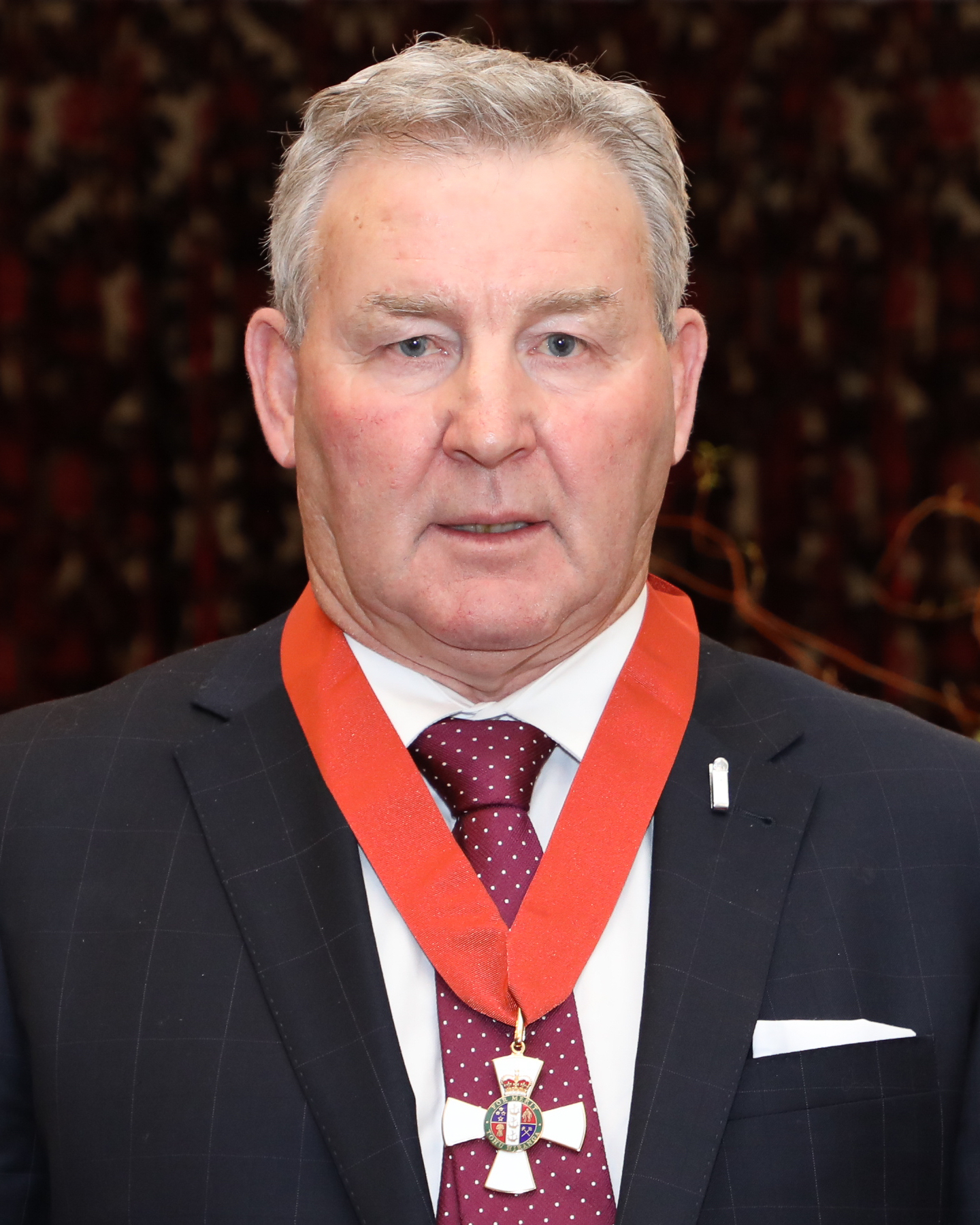
John Monaghan

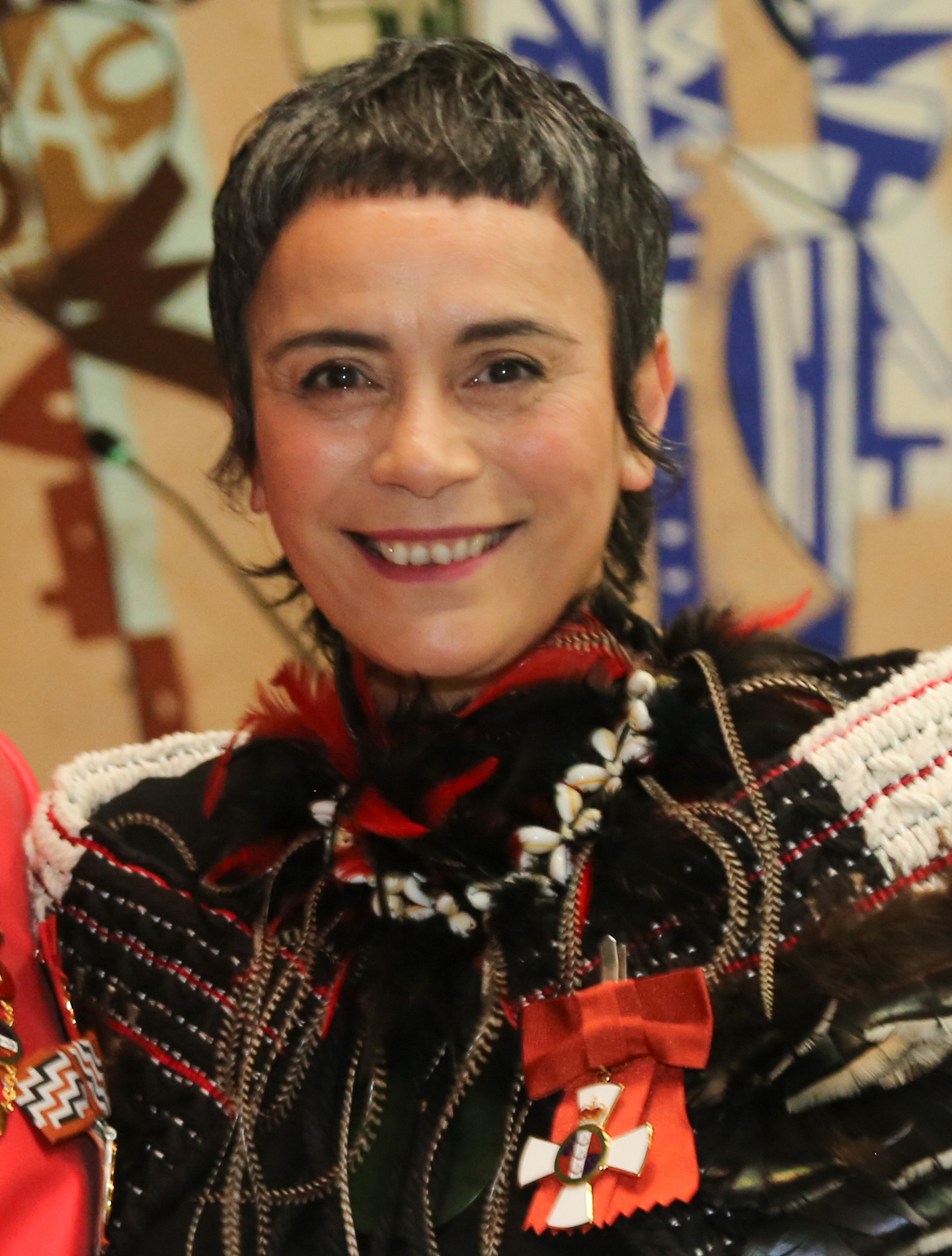
Lisa Reihana

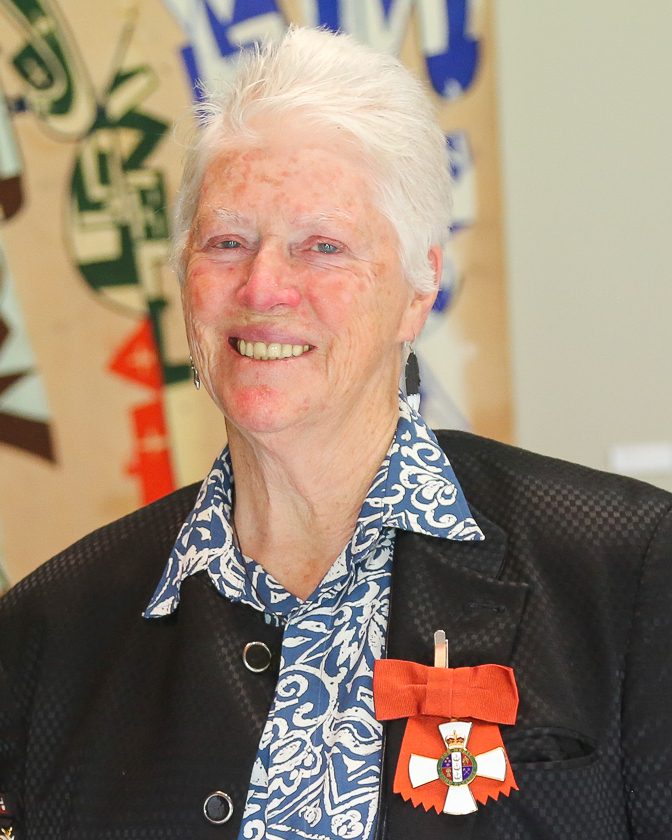
Miriam Saphira

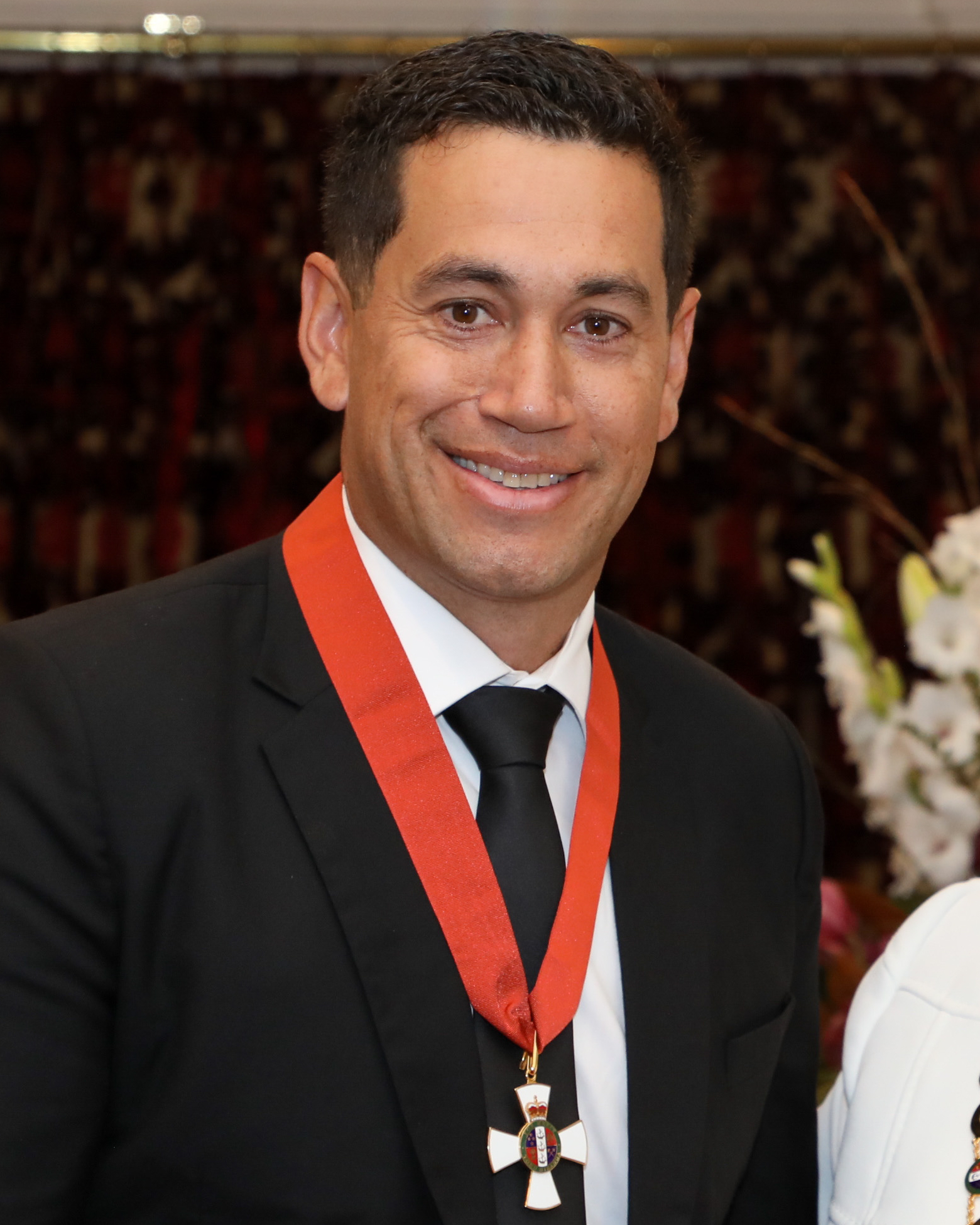
Ross Taylor

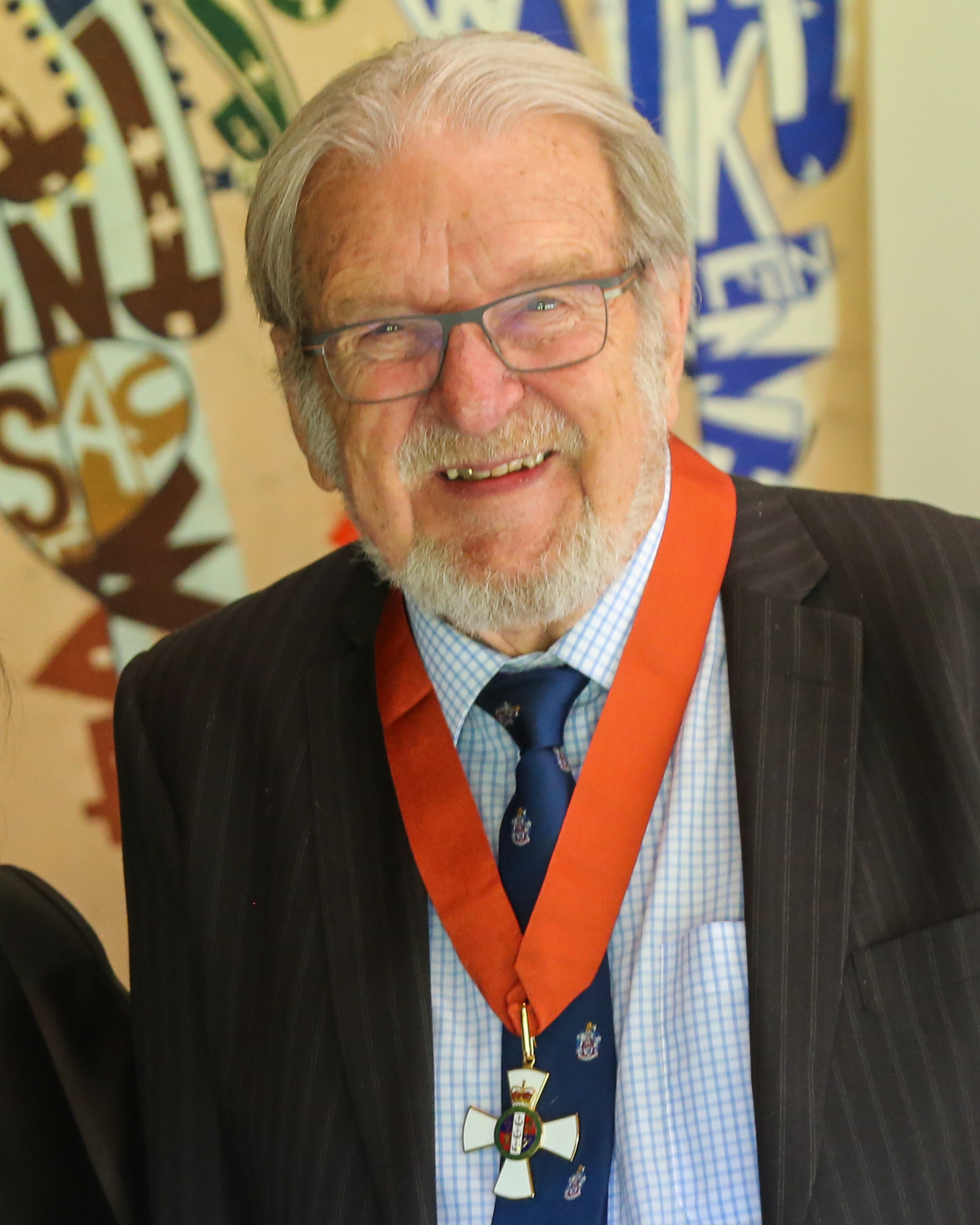
Graeme Woodfield

=== Officer (ONZM) ===
- Uddhav Prasad Adhikary JP – of Blockhouse Bay. For services to the Nepalese community.
- Dr Bryan William Robert Betty – of Karori. For services to health.
- Dr Hilary Blacklock – of Westmere. For services to haematology.
- Gresham Barry Bradley – of Northcote. For services to the LGBTQIA+ community and education.
- Gregory John Brightwell (Matahi Avauli Brightwell) – of Gisborne. For services to waka ama.
- Mathilda Margareth Broodkoorn – of Haruru. For services to health and Māori.
- Souella Maria Cumming DStJ – of Newlands. For services to governance.
- Hinerangi Rachael Edwards – of Wairoa. For services to Māori, governance and education.
- Pamela May Elgar – of Meadowbank. For services to hockey and women.
- Susan Jane Elliott – of Westmere. For services to human rights advocacy, particularly refugees.
- Professor Francis Antony Frizelle – of Cashmere. For services to health.
- Donald John Griffin – of Carterton. For services to tertiary education and sport.
- Lynda Louise Hagen – of Johnsonville. For services to law and the community.
- Professor John Graham Hampton – of Mairehau. For services to agricultural science.
- Tangihaere Gloria Harihari-Hughes – of Western Heights. For services to Māori and youth.
- John Mitchel Kirkpatrick – of Hastings. For services to shearing sports.
- Faafetai Jonathan Lemalu – of London. For services to opera.
- Denise Messiter – of Te Puru. For services to Māori and health.
- Brian Robert Mulligan – of Hobsonville. For services to physiotherapy.
- Dr Gordon Ian Nicholson – of Epsom. For services to health and the community.
- Emeritus Professor Anthony Ian Parker – of Wadestown. For services to industrial design.
- Roderick Christopher Dominic John Pelosi – of Palmerston North. For services to football.
- Desmond Leslie Peters – of Addington. For services to the snow sport industry.
- Petronella (Marjet) Maria Pot – of Mount Eden. For services to women's health.
- Beverly Margaret Pownall – of Mount Roskill. For services to health, particularly breastfeeding.
- Dr Daphne Joan Rickson – of Paekākāriki. For services to music therapy.
- Dr Anne Katherine Robertson – of Palmerston North. For services to sexual health.
- Lorraine Susan Scanlon – of Westport. For services to Victim Support and the community.
- Bridget Ann Snedden – of One Tree Hill. For services to people with learning disabilities.
- Dr Ian Alexander Noel Stringer – of Palmerston North. For services to conservation.
- Dr Oliver Robert Webber Sutherland – of Bishopdale. For services to the law and Māori and Pacific communities.
- Wi Te Tau Pirika Taepa – of Tītahi Bay. For services to Māori art, particularly ceramics.
- Dr John David Tait – of Oriental Bay. For services to obstetrics and gynaecology.
- Dr Margrietha Johanna Theron – of Pomare. For services to science and the community.
- Sharyn Elizabeth Underwood – of Ōtamatea. For services to dance.
- Anne June Urlwin – of Wānaka. For services to business.
- Eileen Nora Varley – of Richmond. For services to addiction services.
- Lisa Walker – of Island Bay. For services as a jeweller.
- Bub (Hera) White – of Raglan. For services to Māori and tertiary education.
- Chelsea Jane Winstanley – of Grey Lynn. For services to the screen industry and Māori.
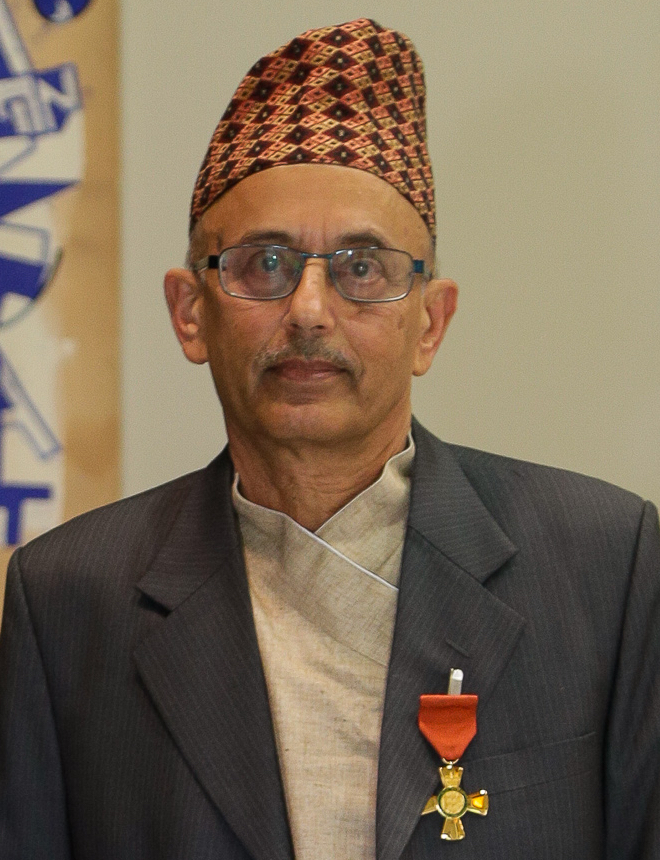
Uddhav Adhikary

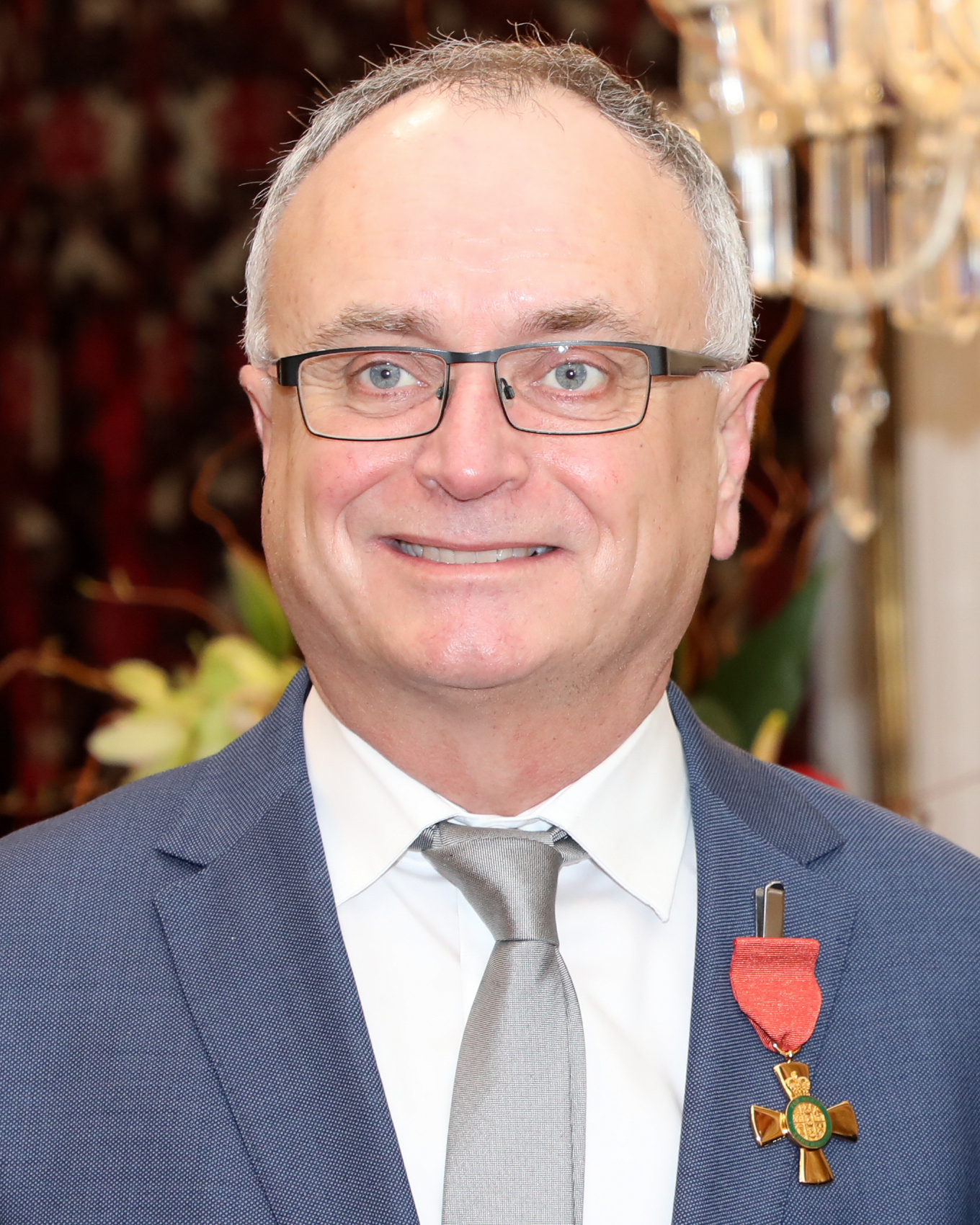
Bryan Betty

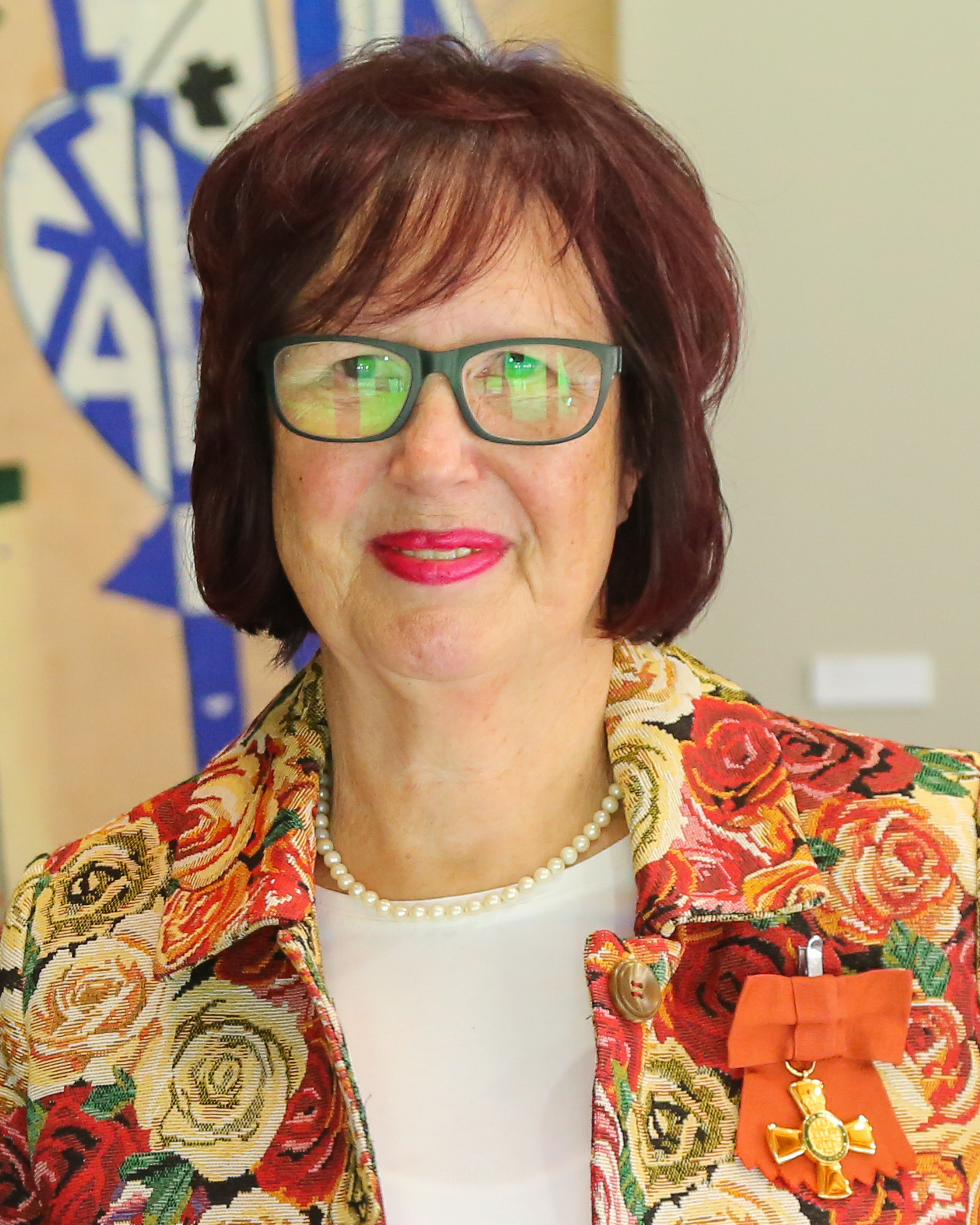
Hilary Blacklock

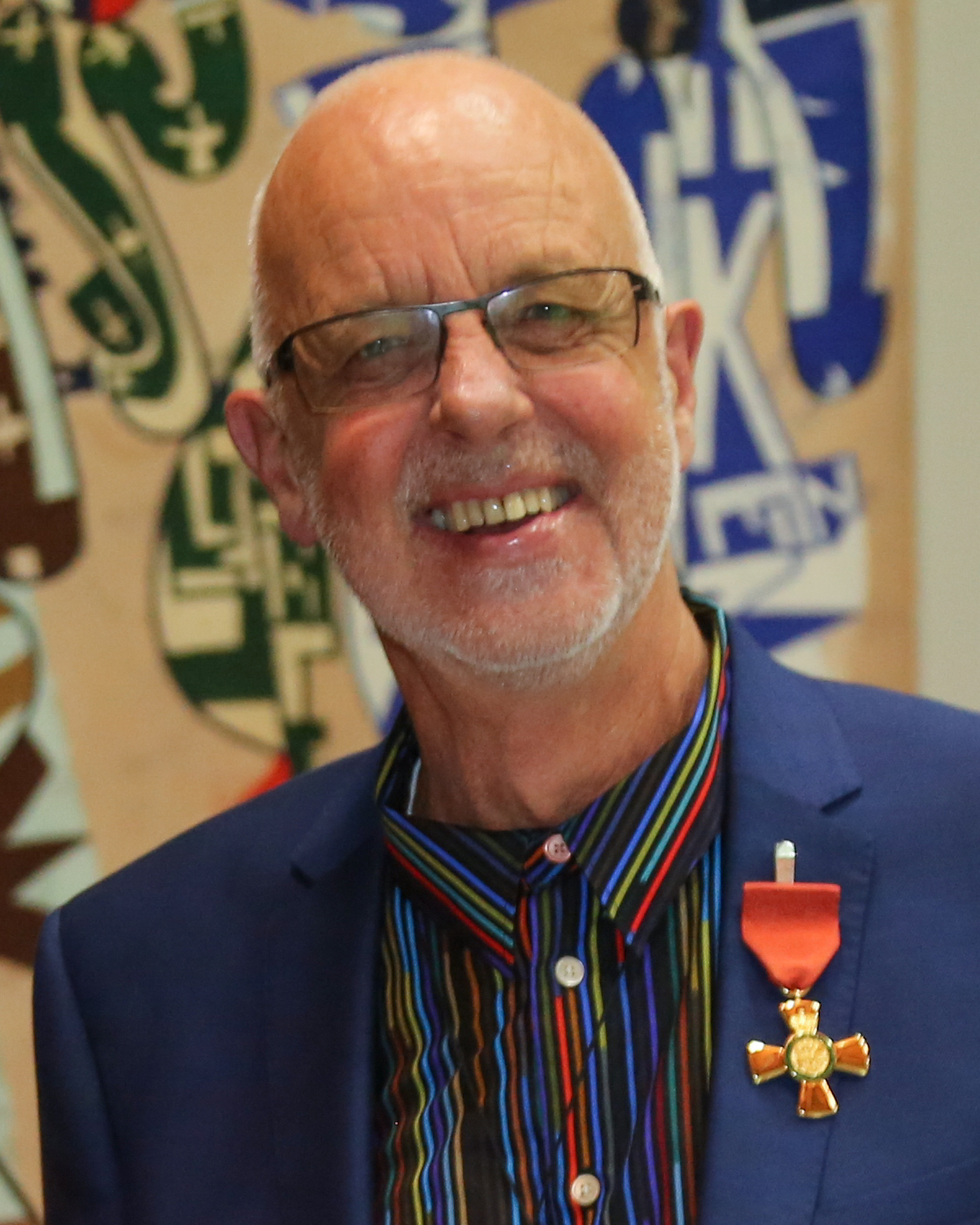
Gresham Bradley

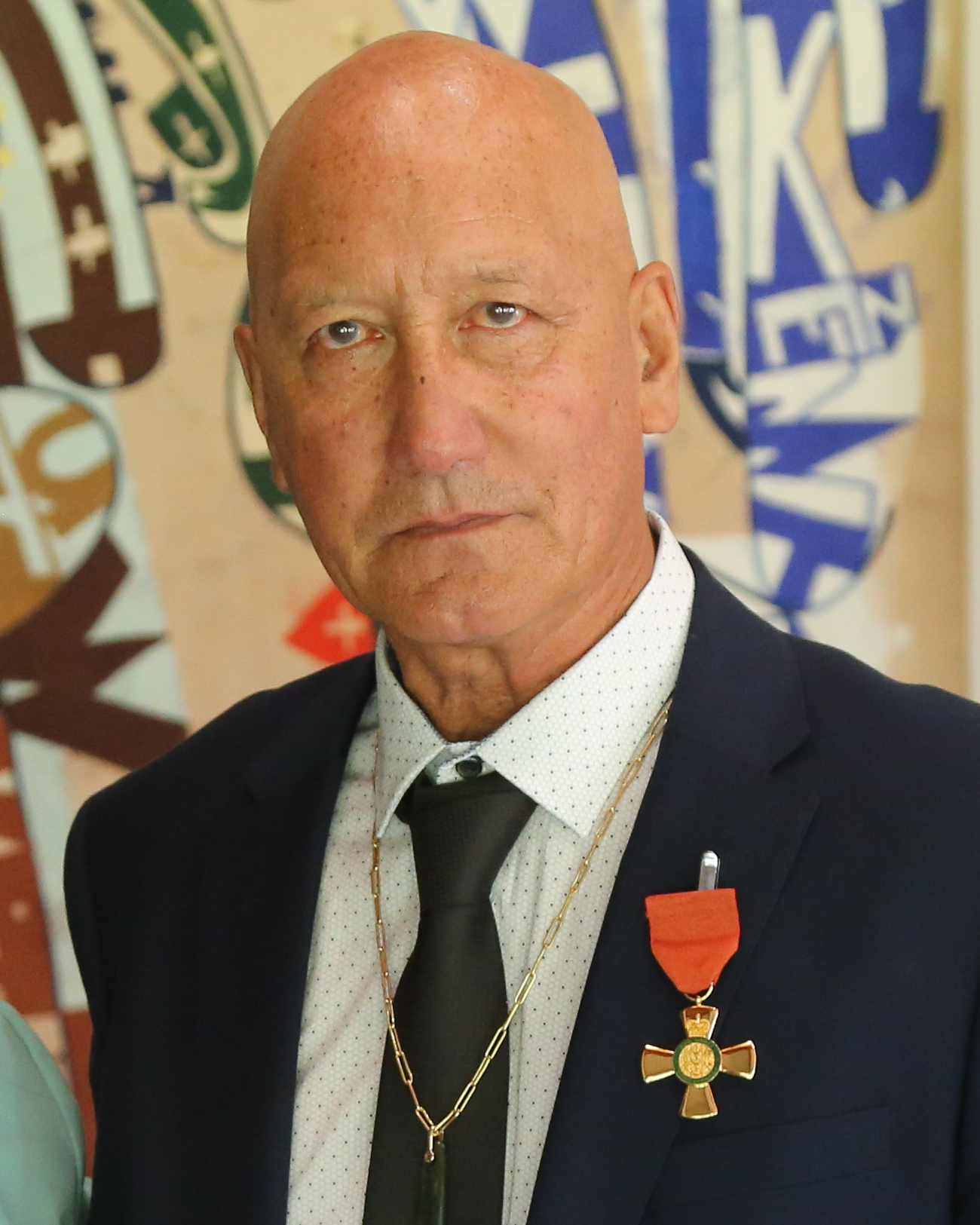
Matahi Brightwell

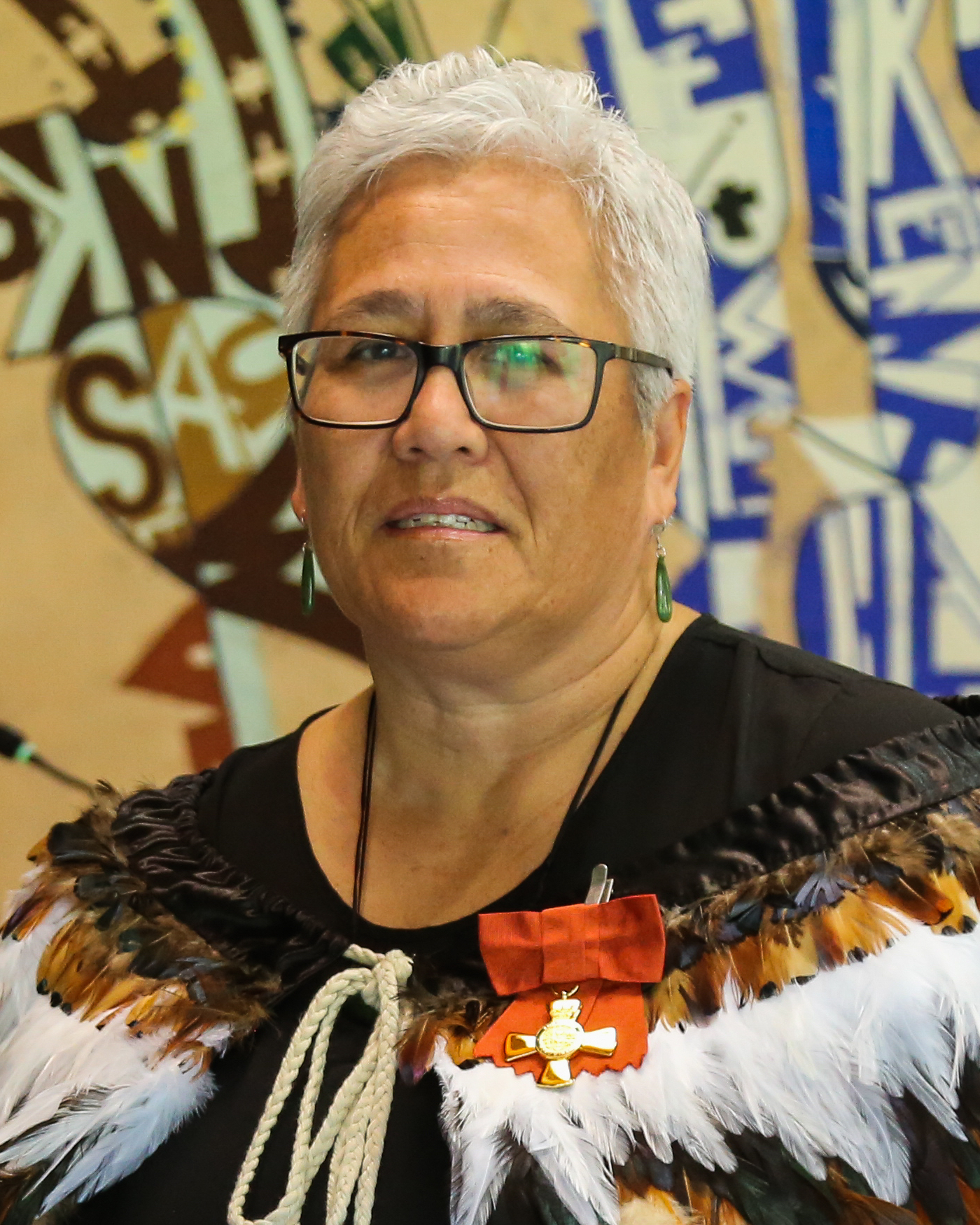
Margareth Broodkoorn

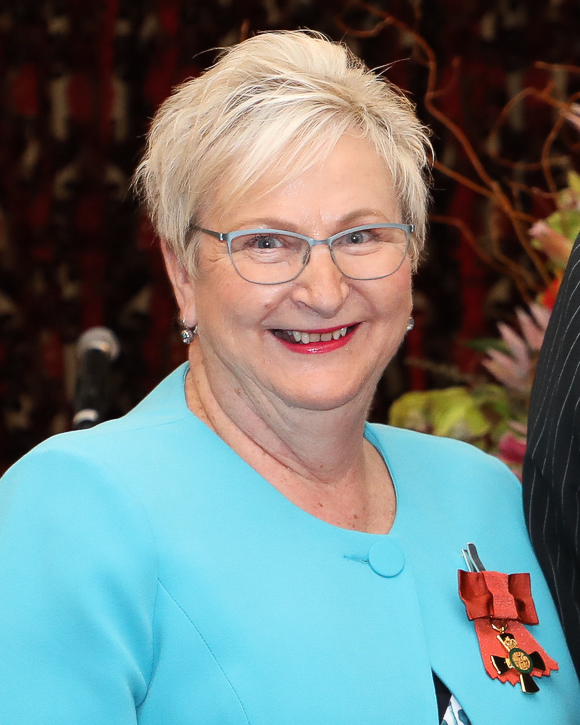
Souella Cumming

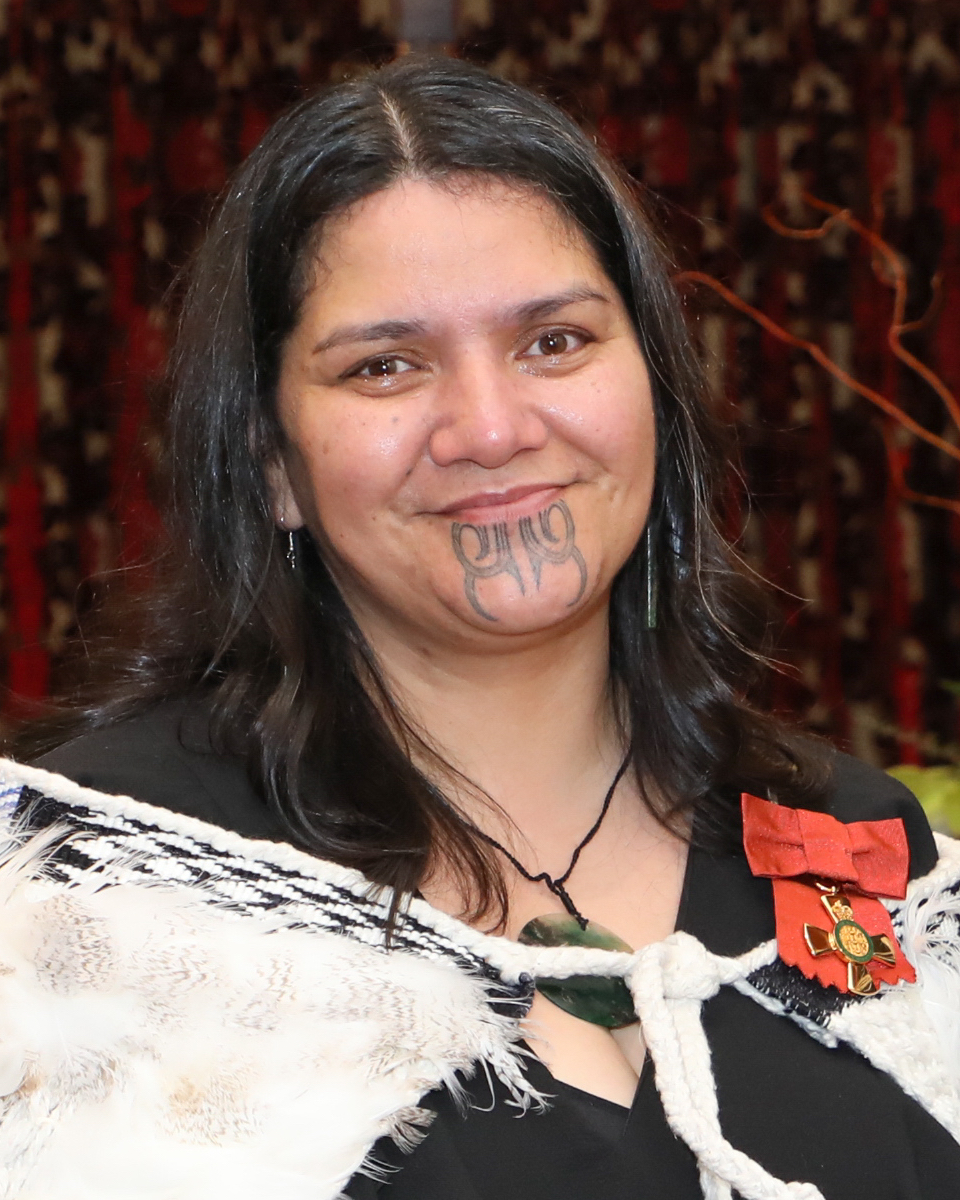
Hinerangi Edwards

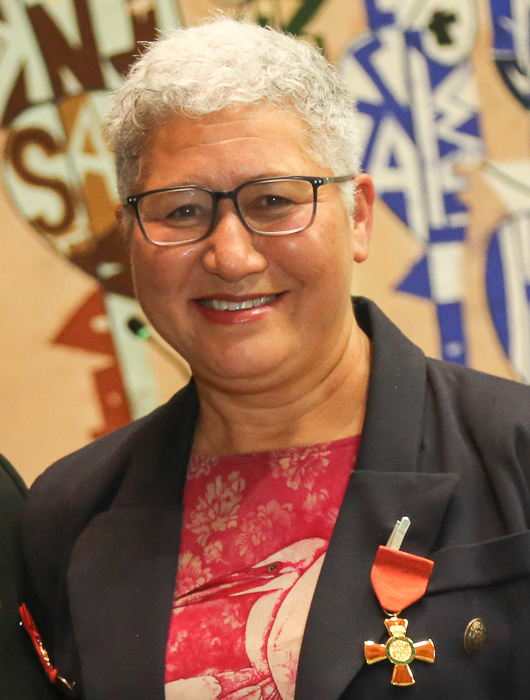
Pam Elgar

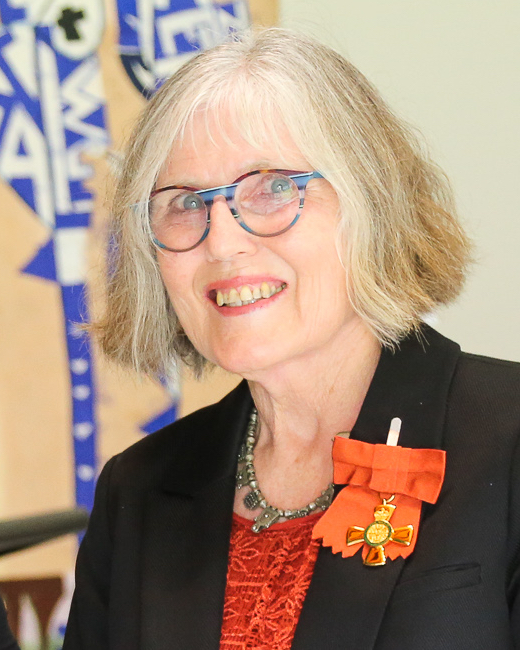
Susan Elliott

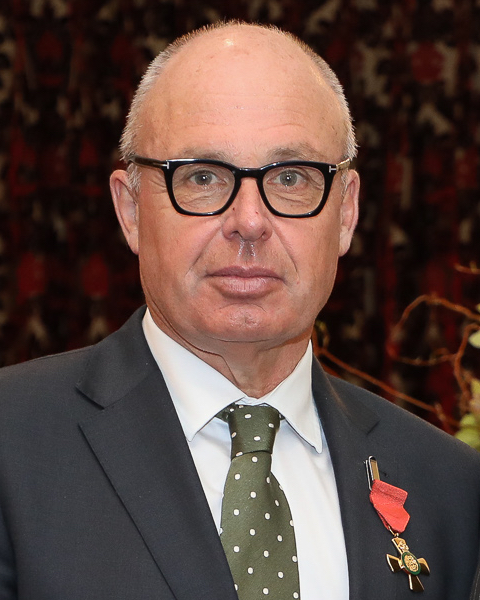
Frank Frizelle

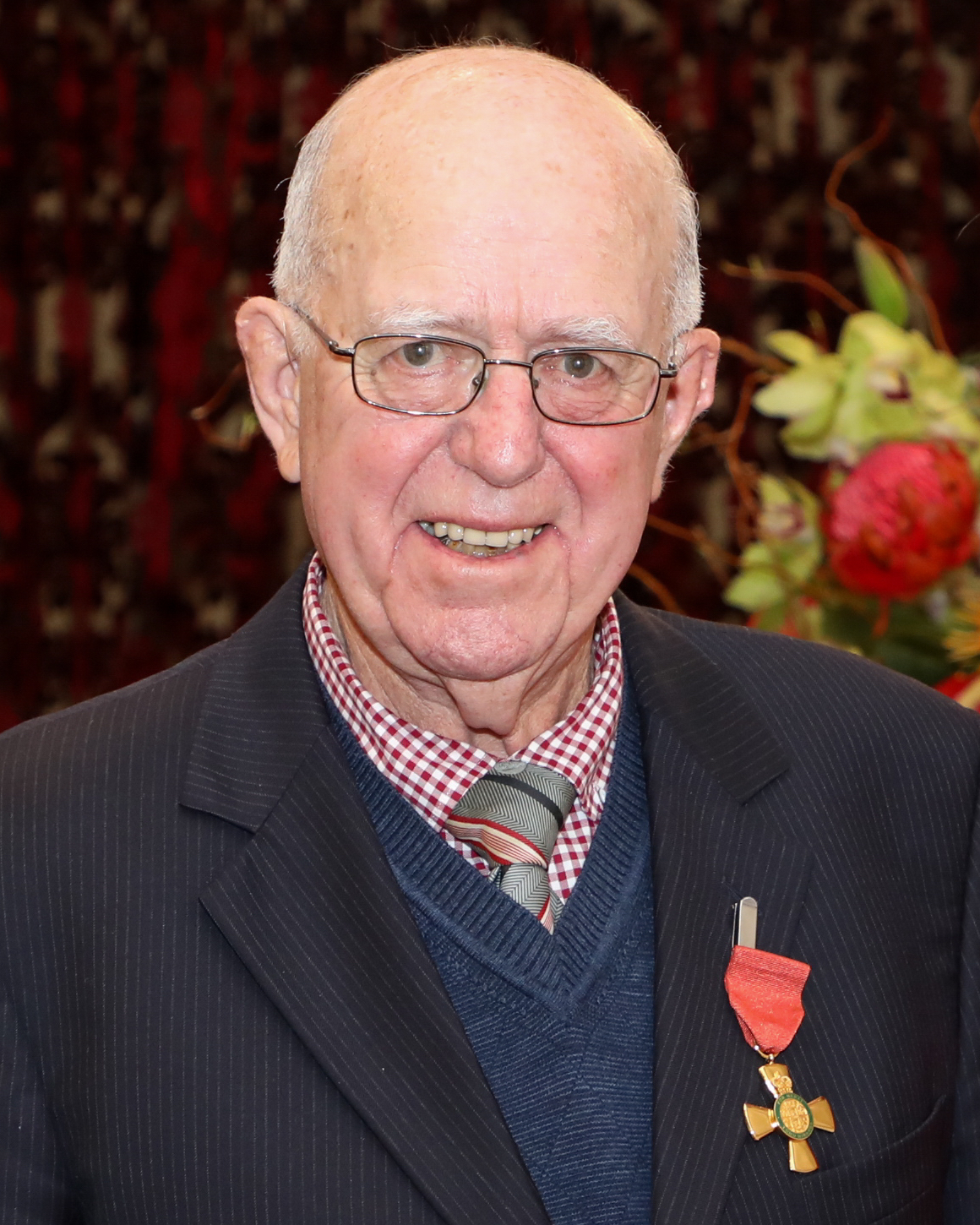
Don Griffin

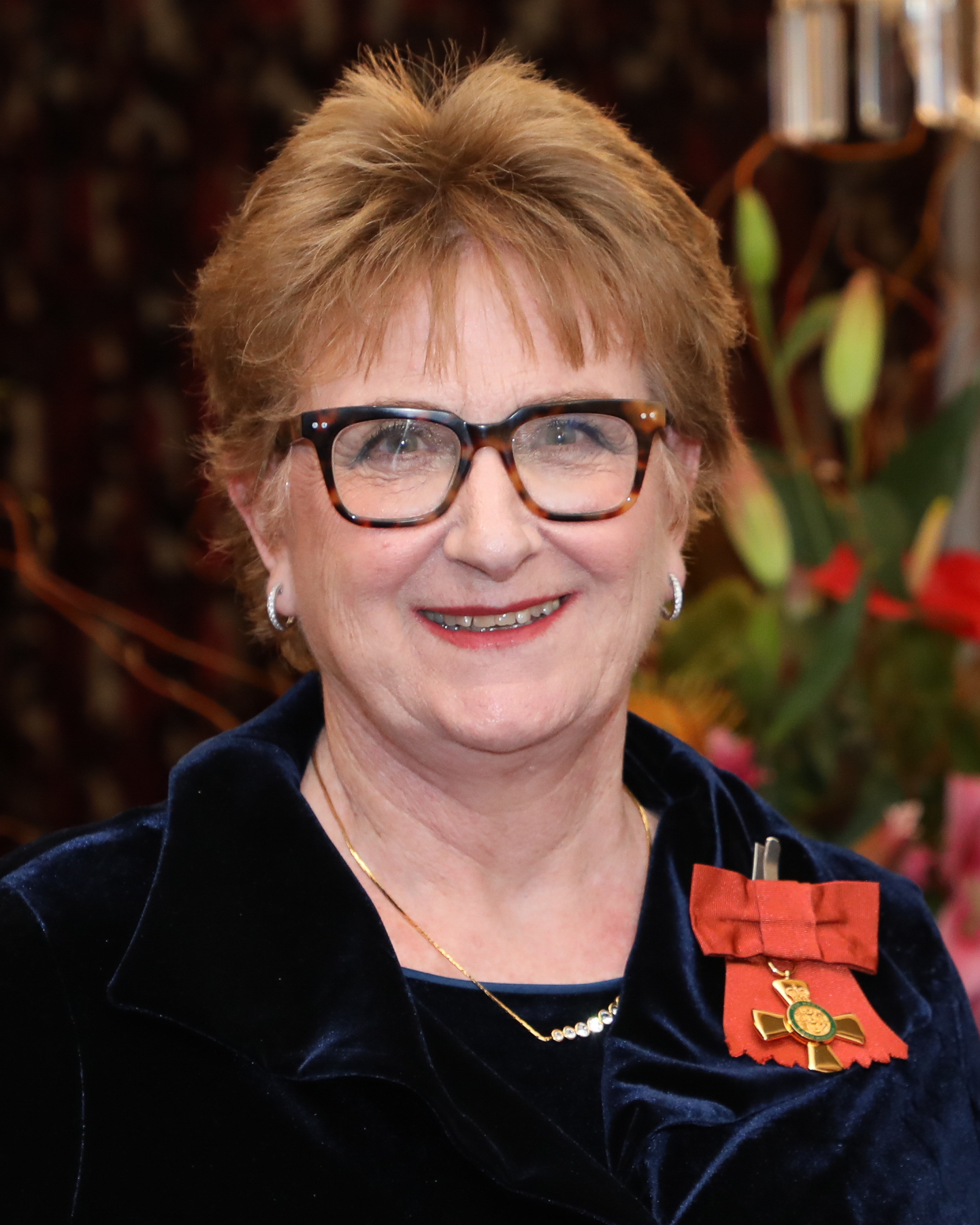
Lynda Hagen

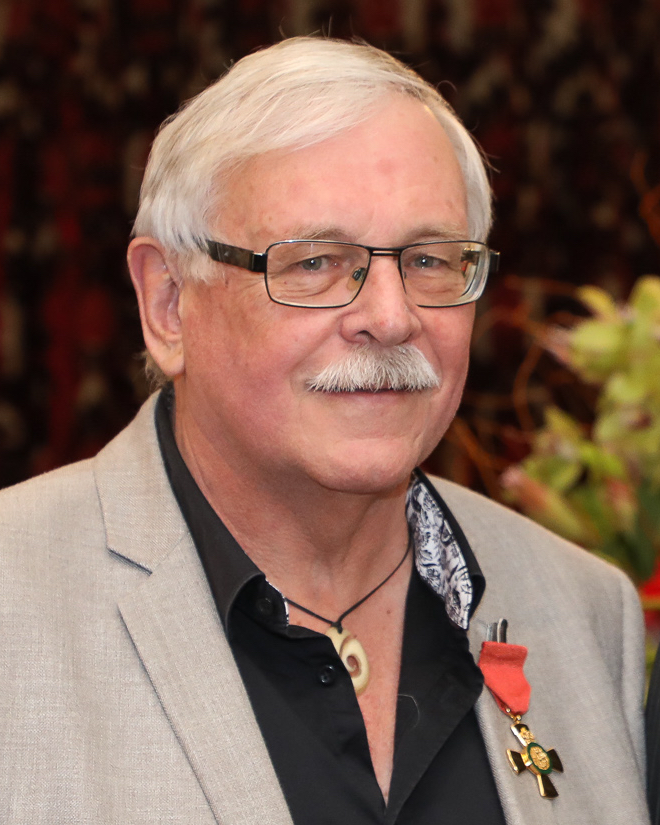
John Hampton

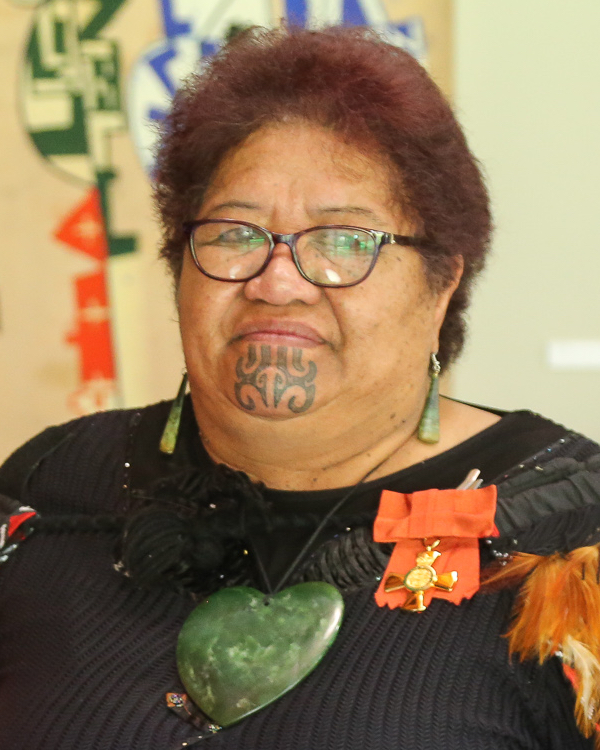
Tangihaere Harihari-Hughes

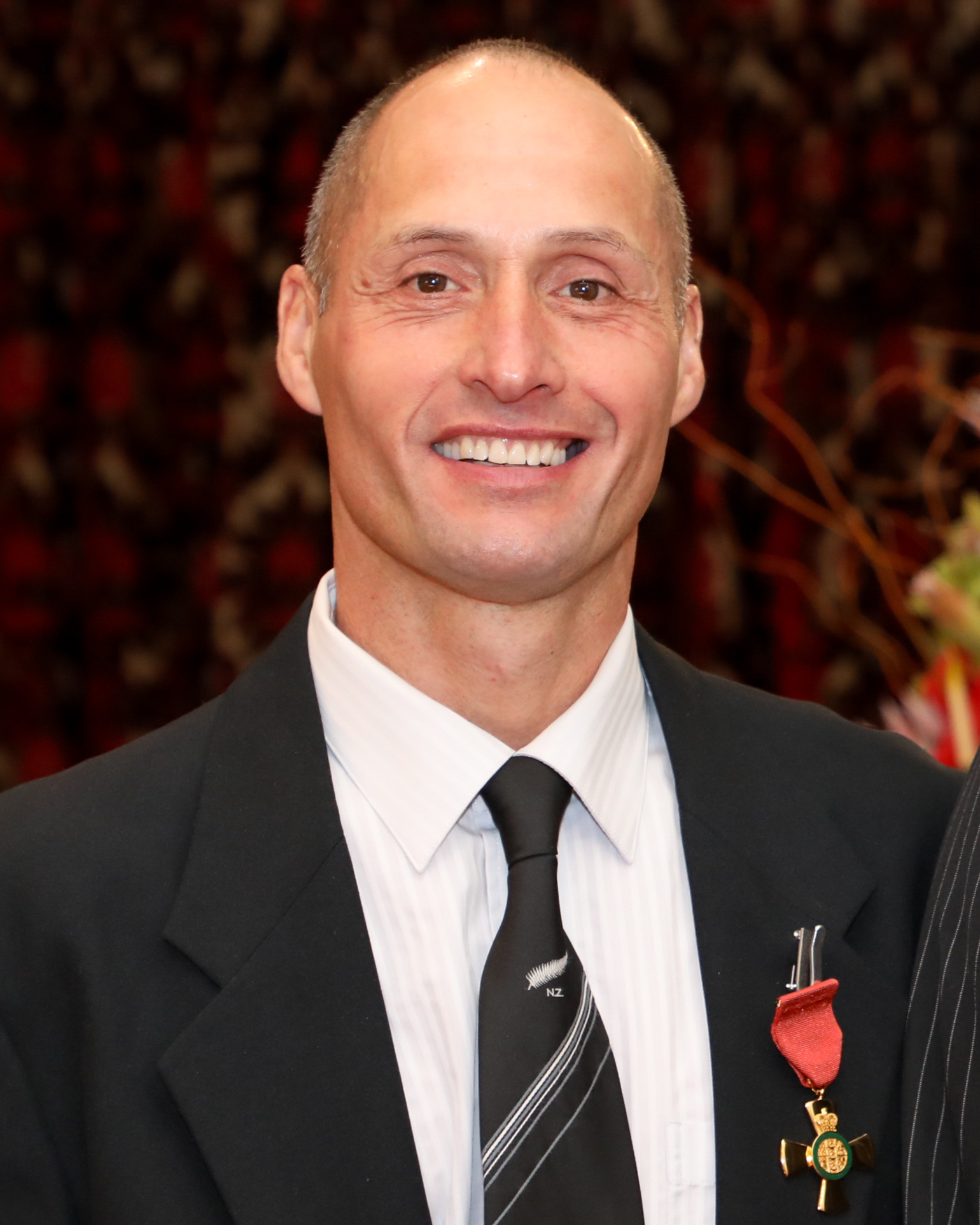
John Kirkpatrick

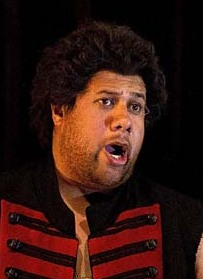
Jonathan Lemalu

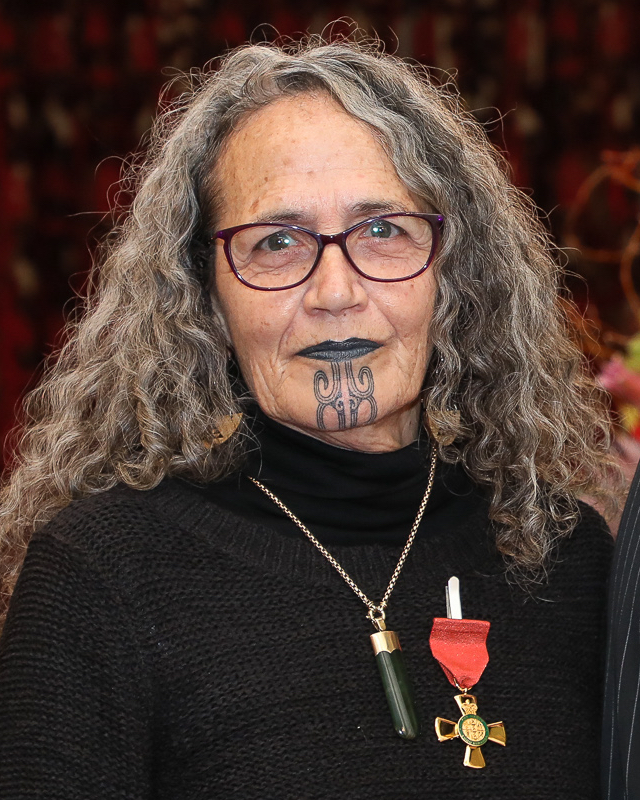
Denise Messiter

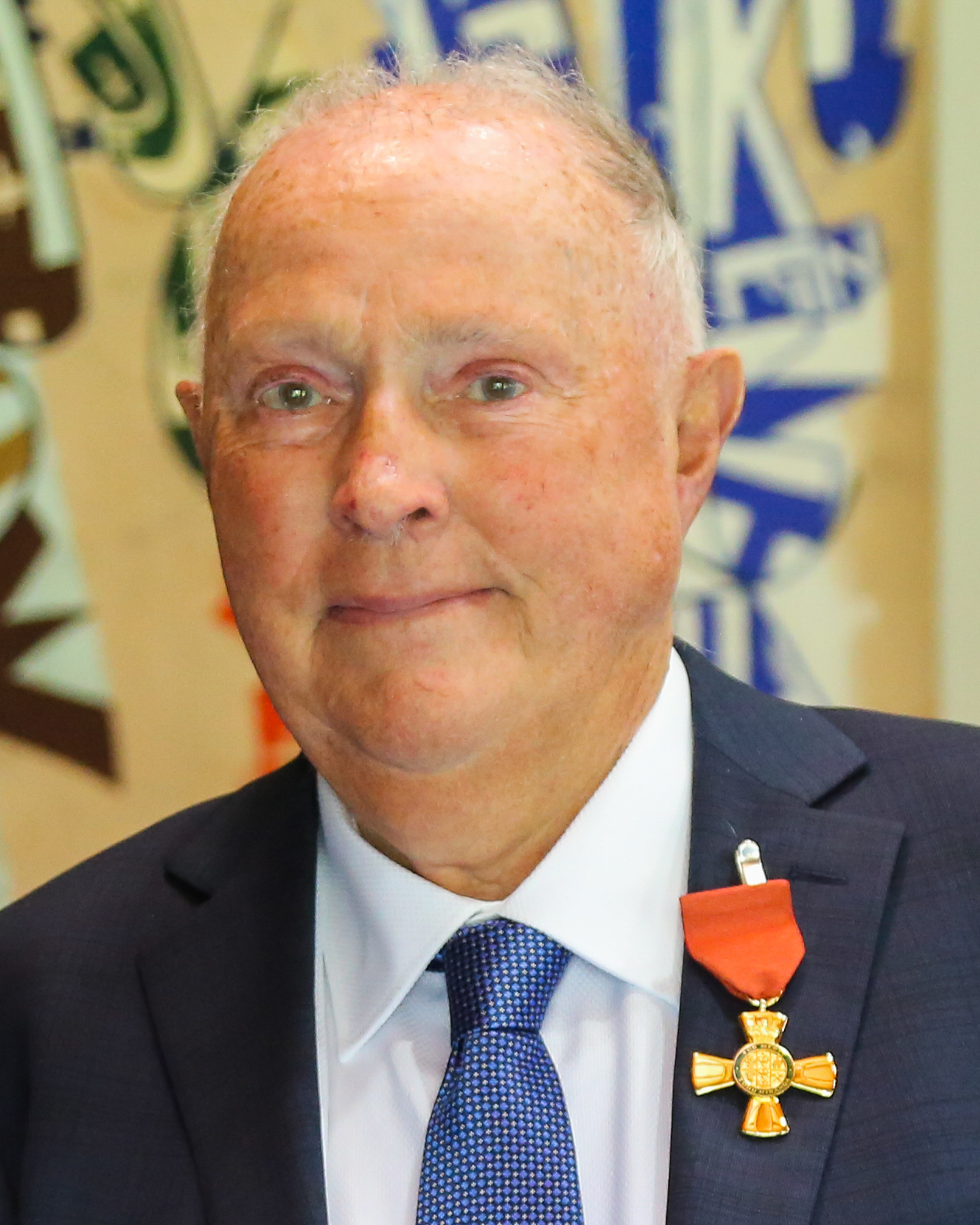
Brian Mulligan

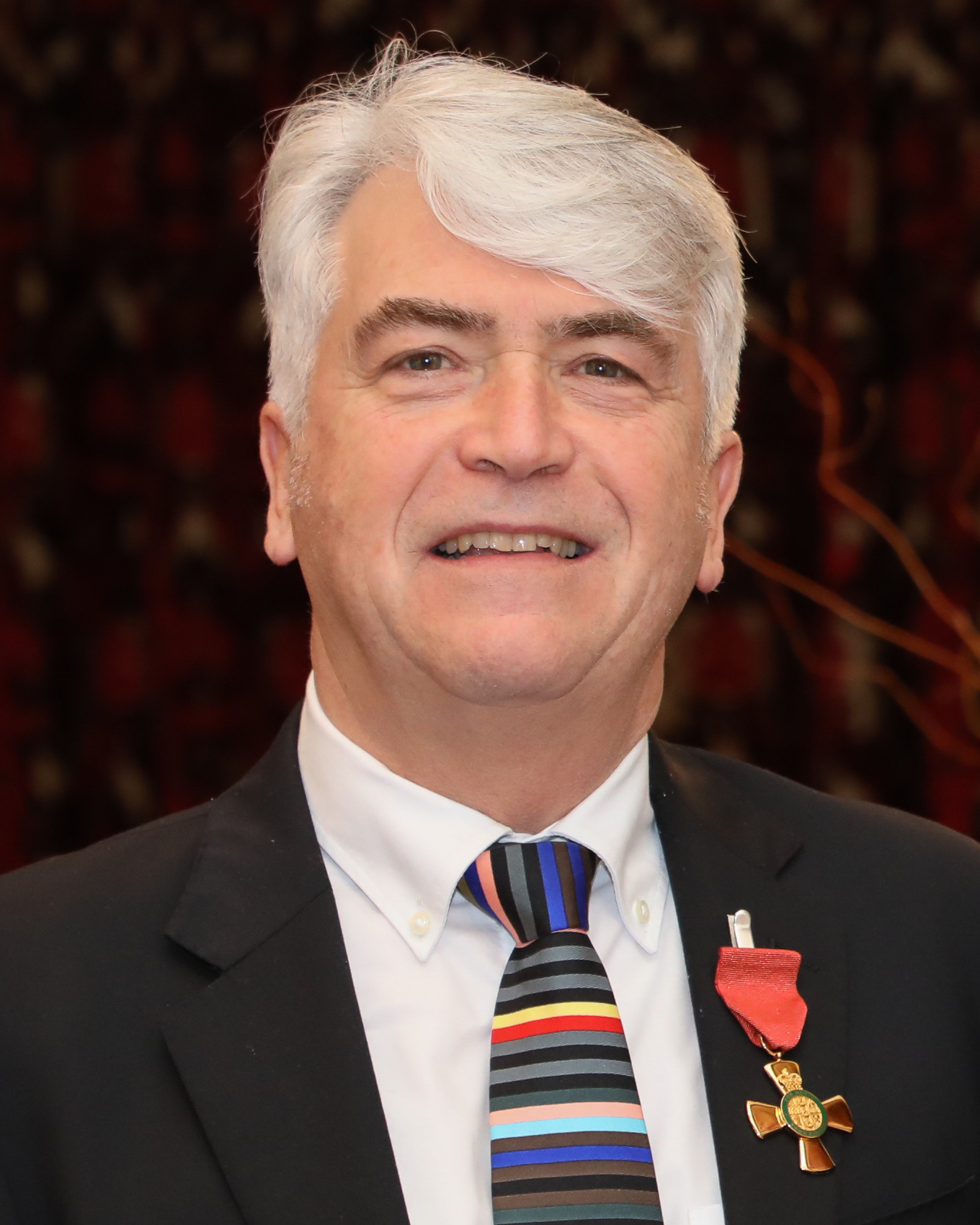
Tony Parker

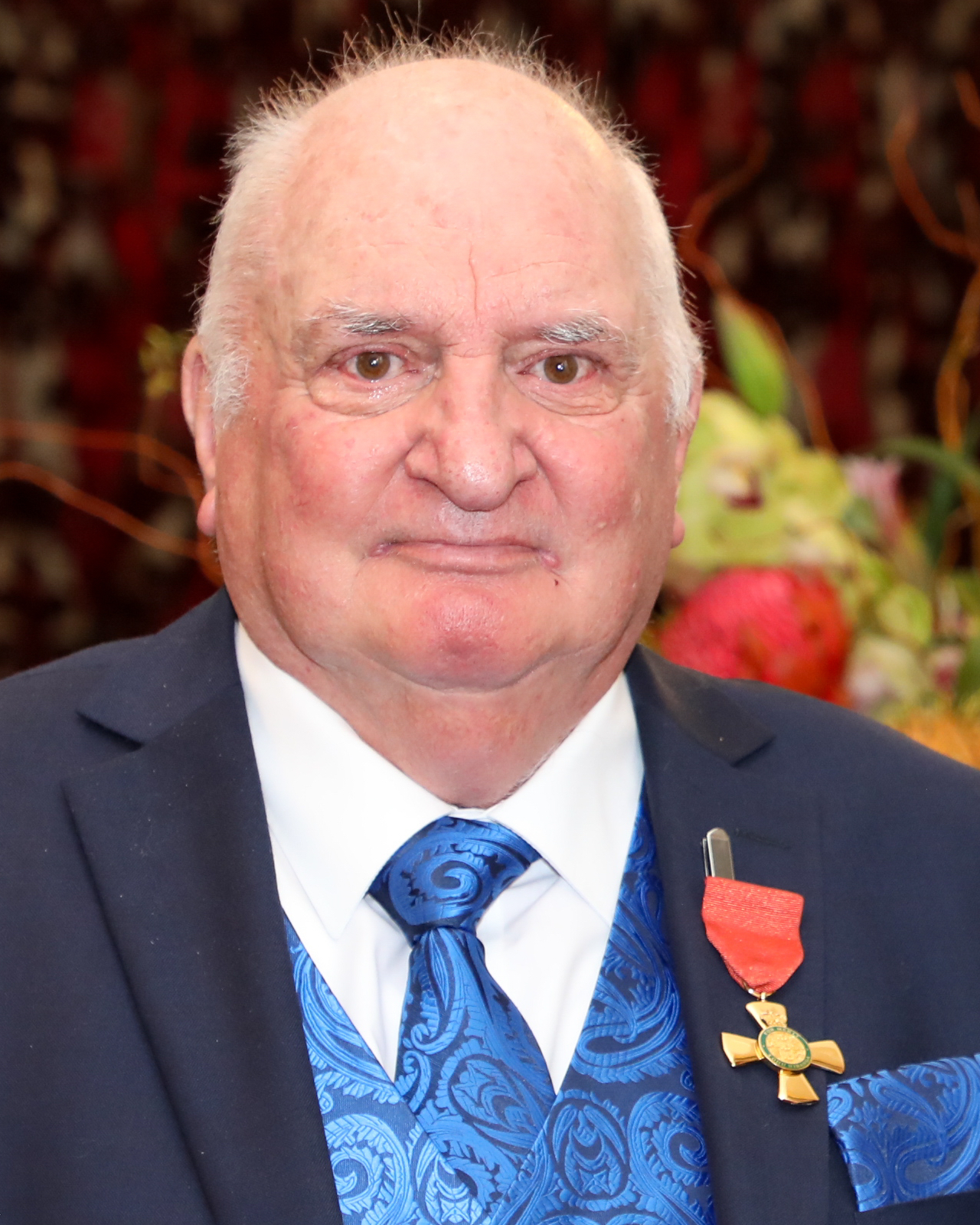
Rod Pelosi

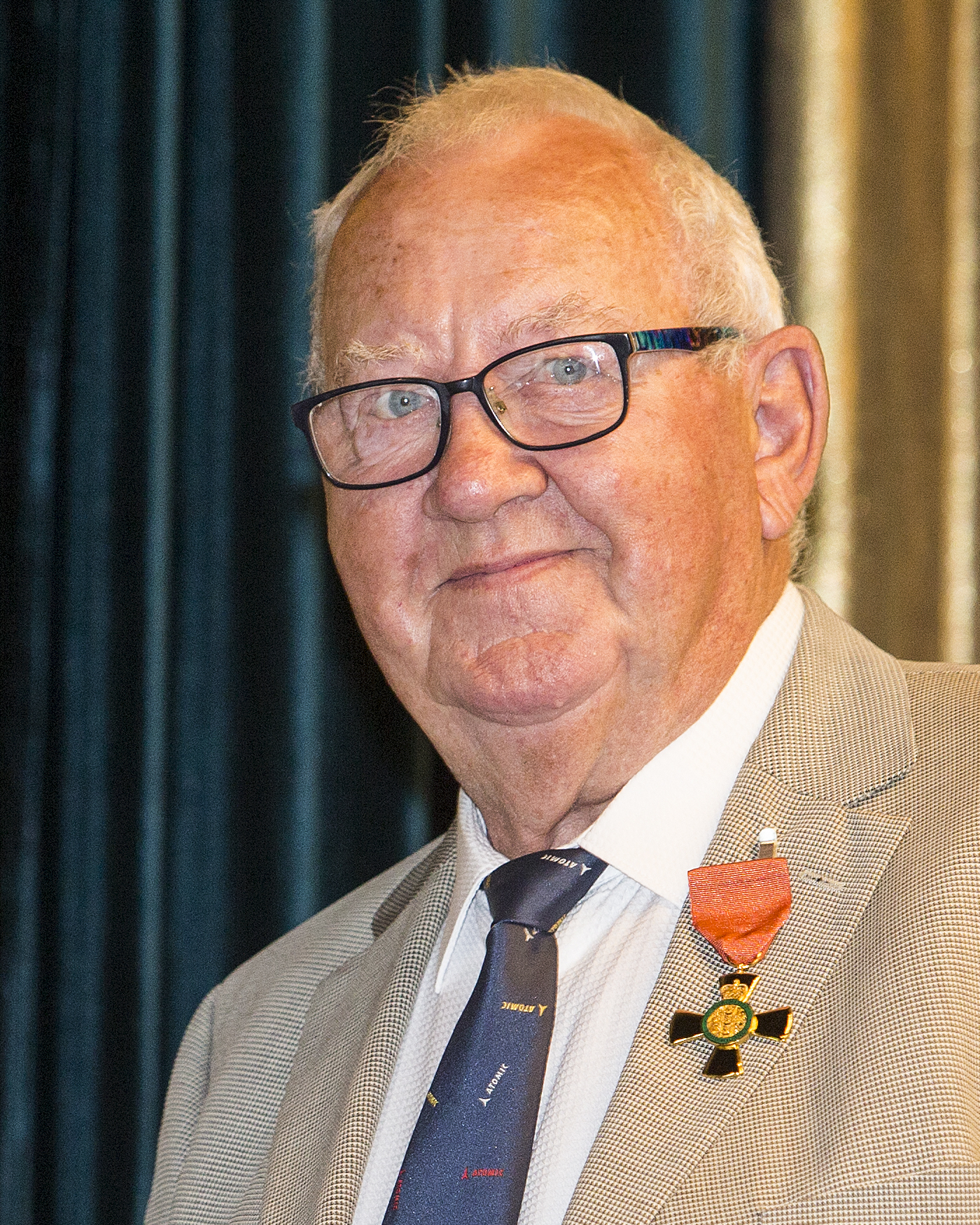
Des Peters

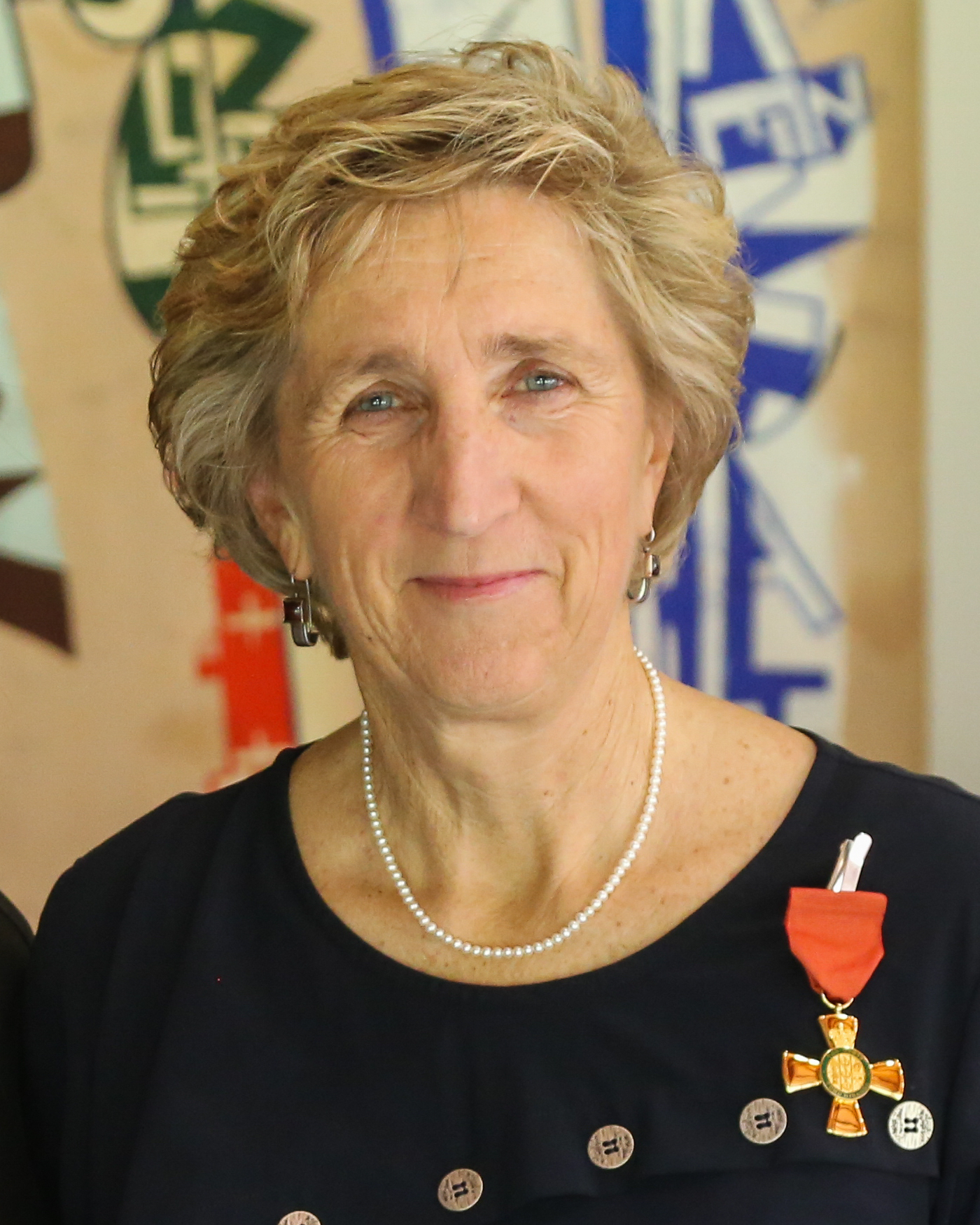
Marjet Pot

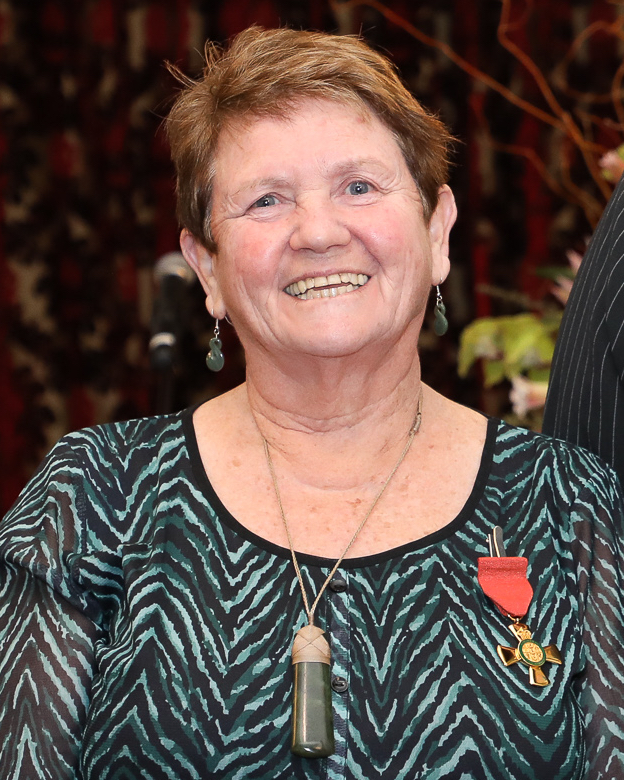
Bev Pownall

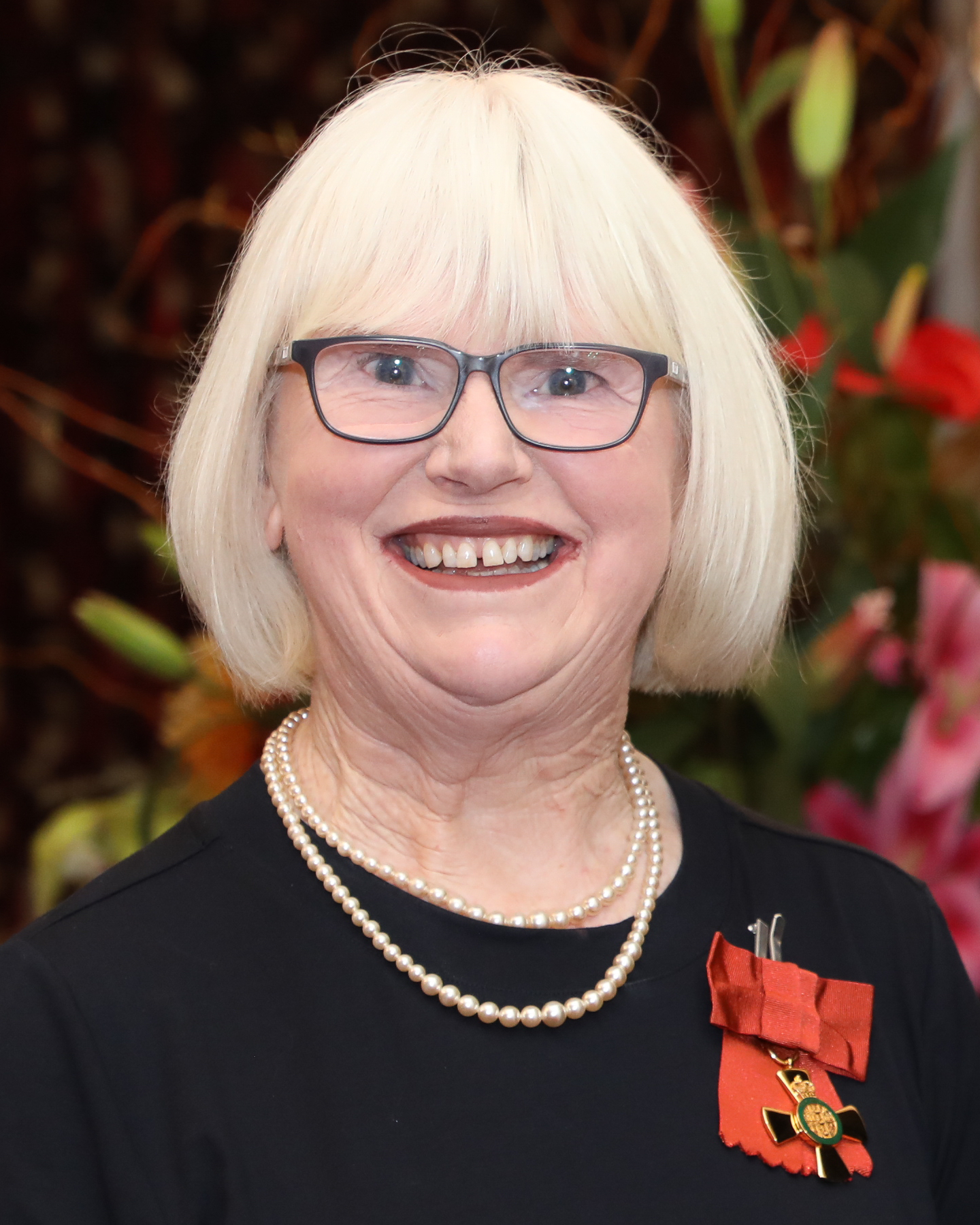
Daphne Rickson

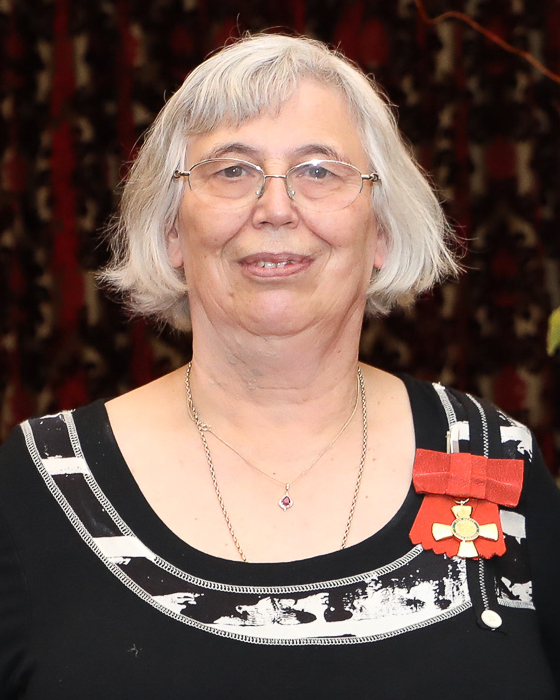
Anne Robertson

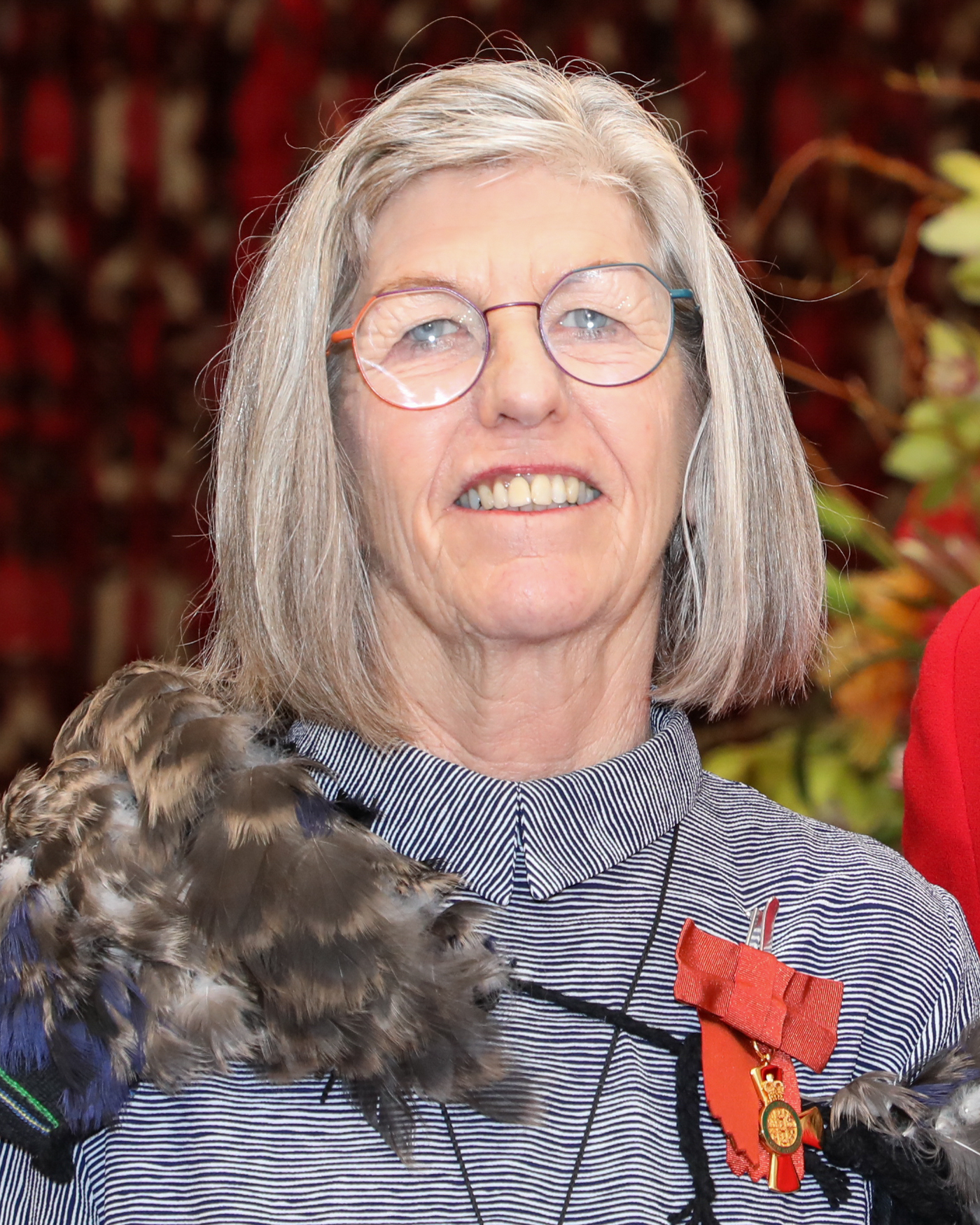
Lorraine Scanlon

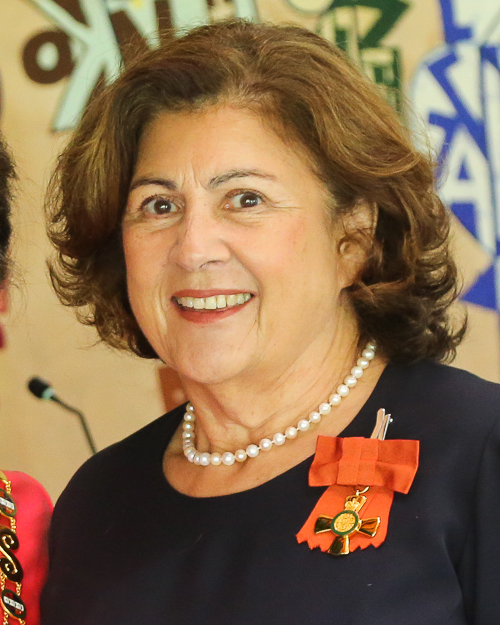
Bridget Snedden

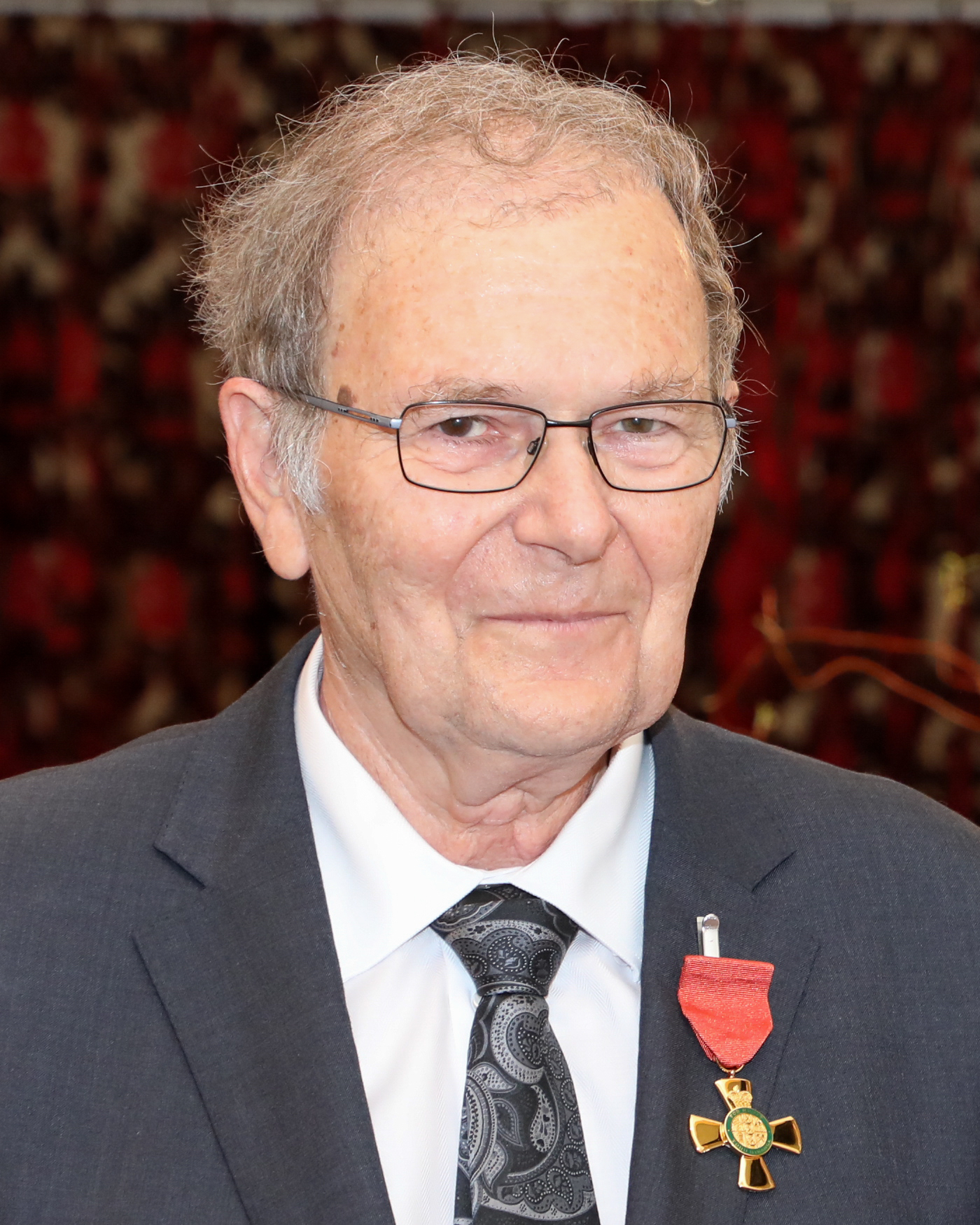
Ian Stringer

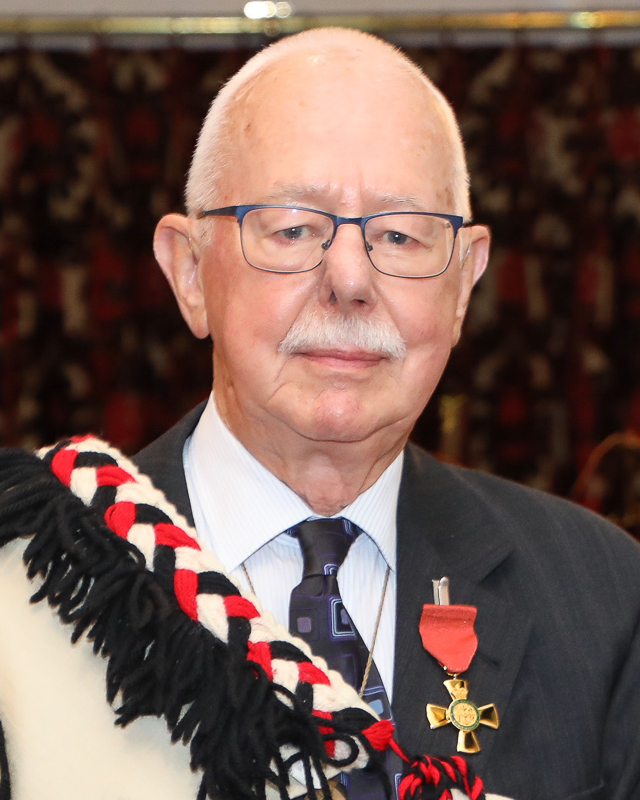
Oliver Sutherland

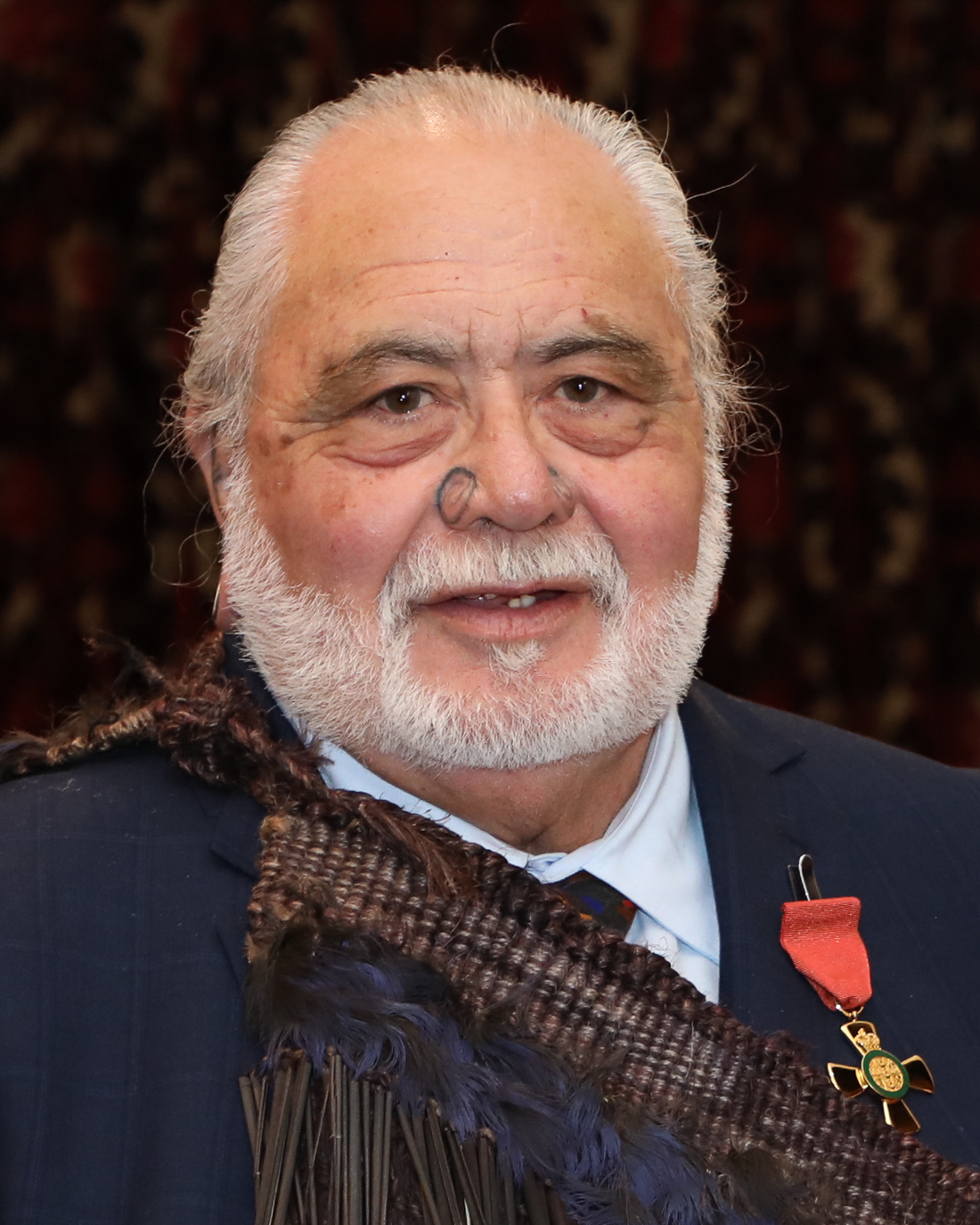
Wi Taepa

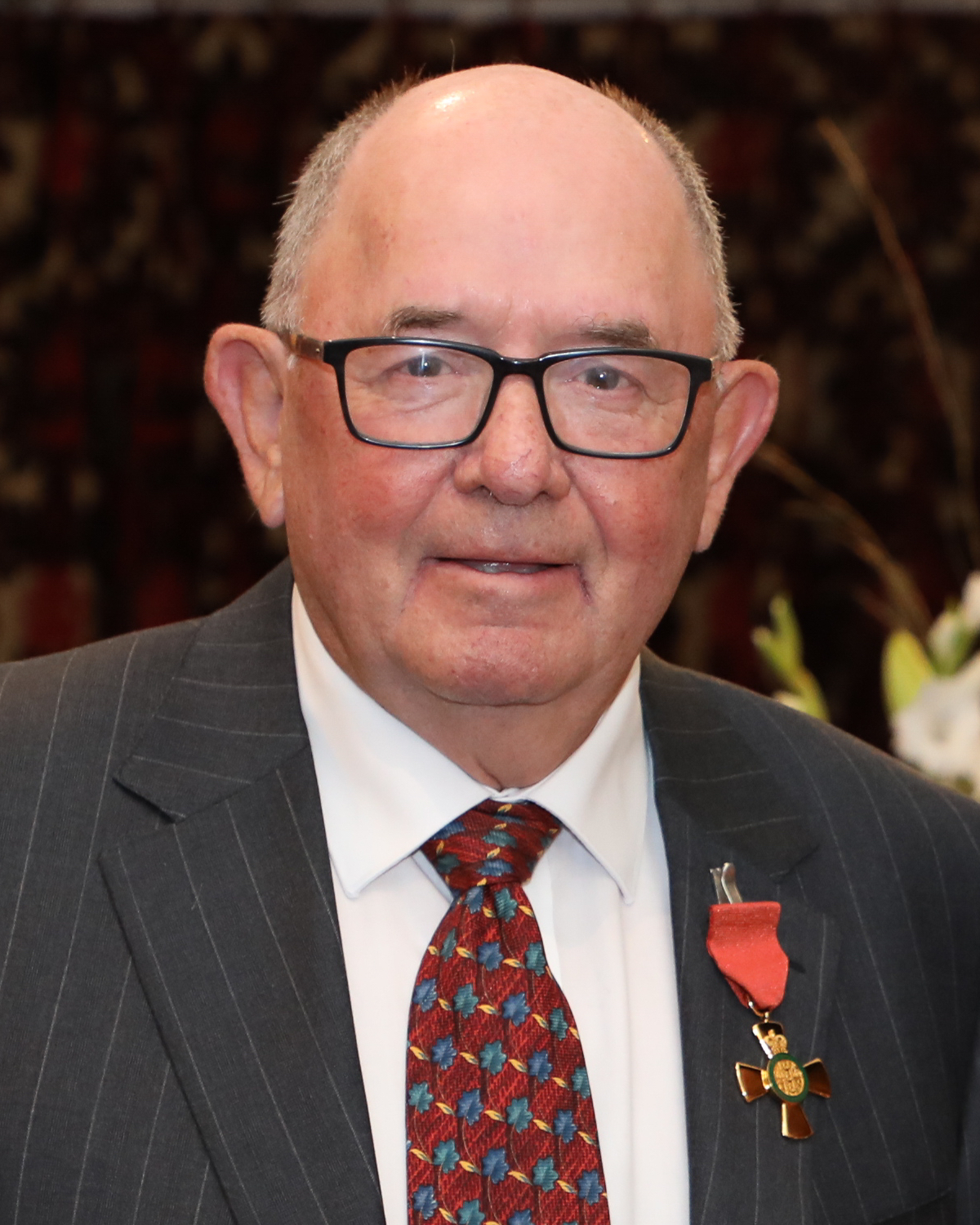
John Tait

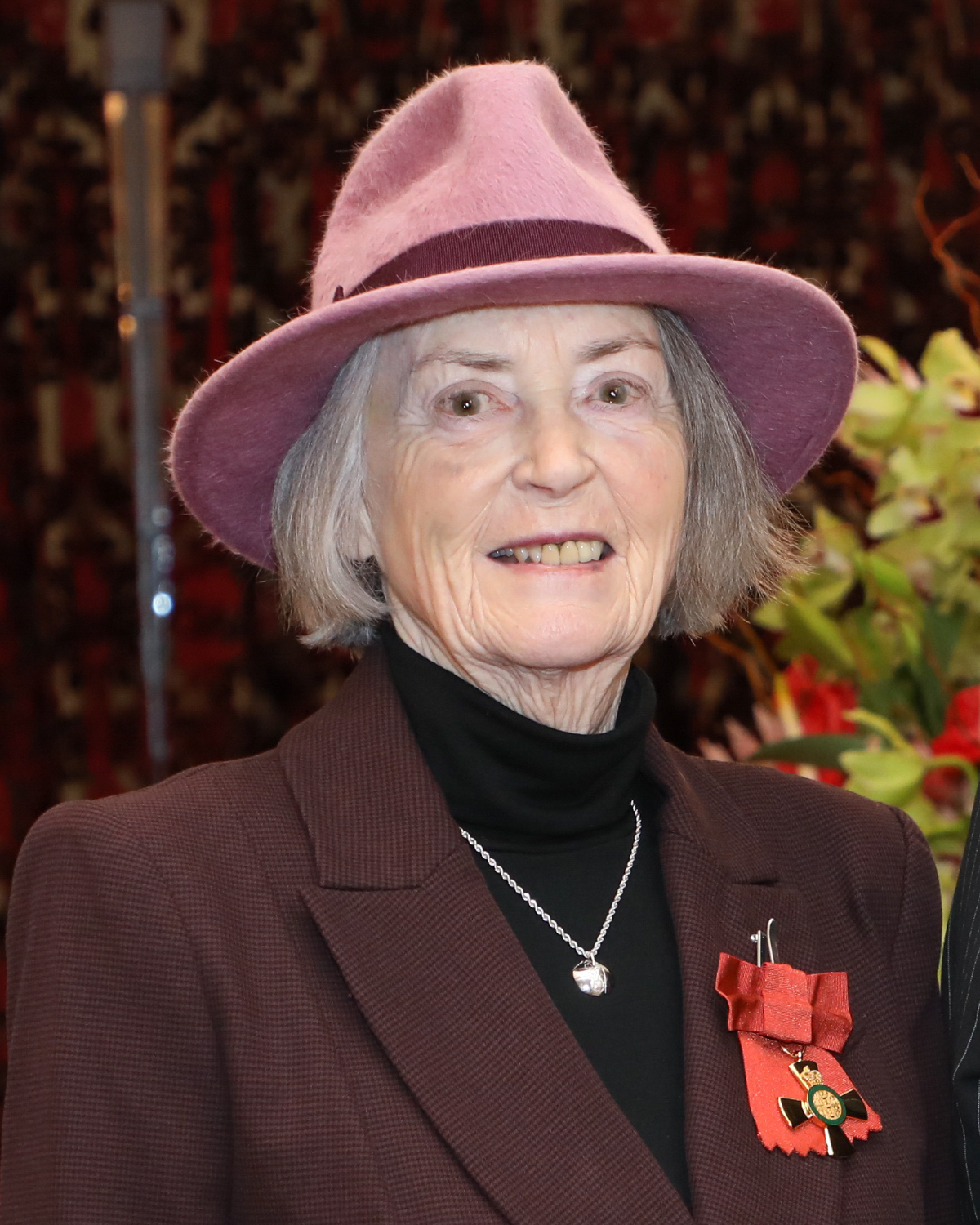
Margriet Theron

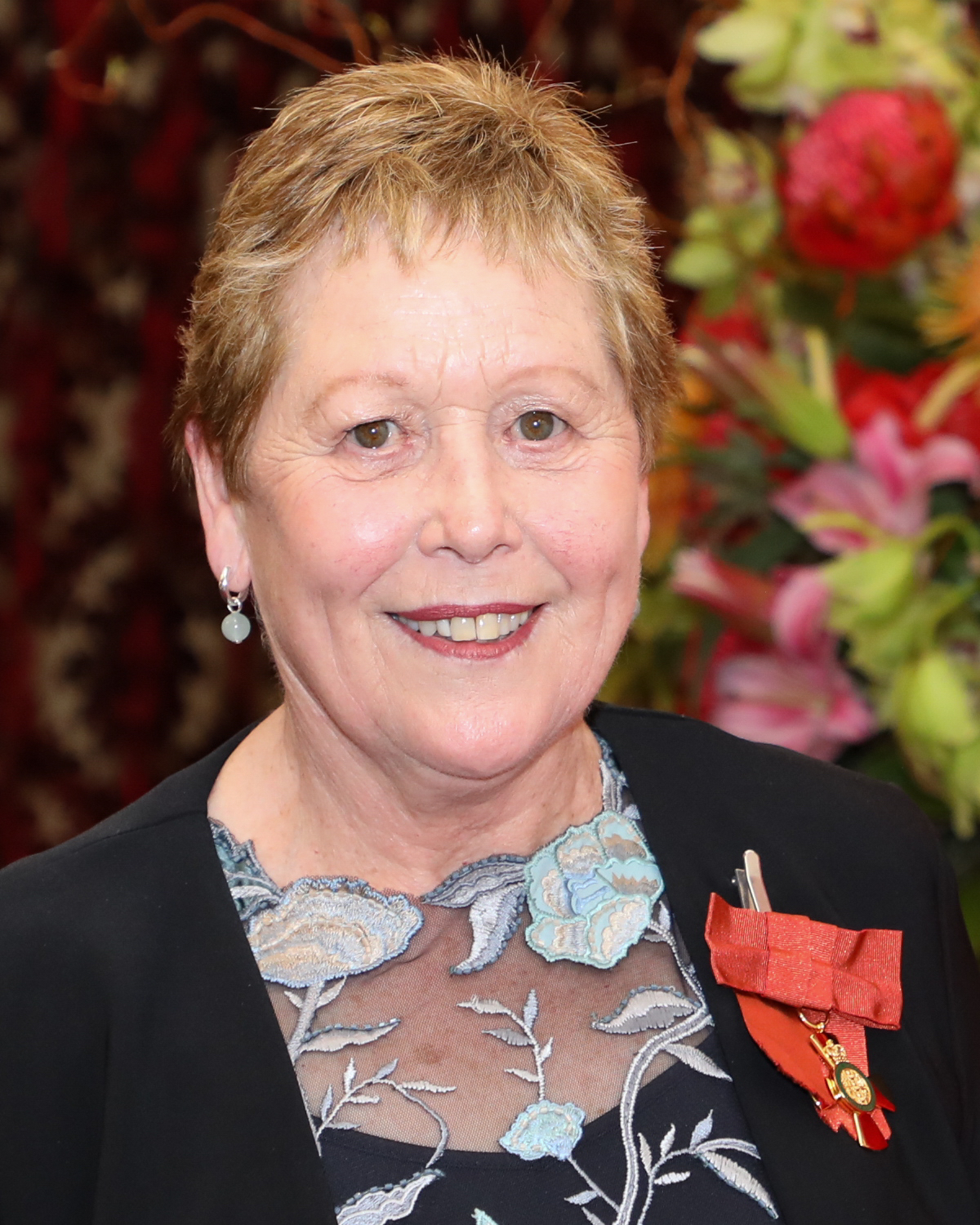
Sharyn Underwood

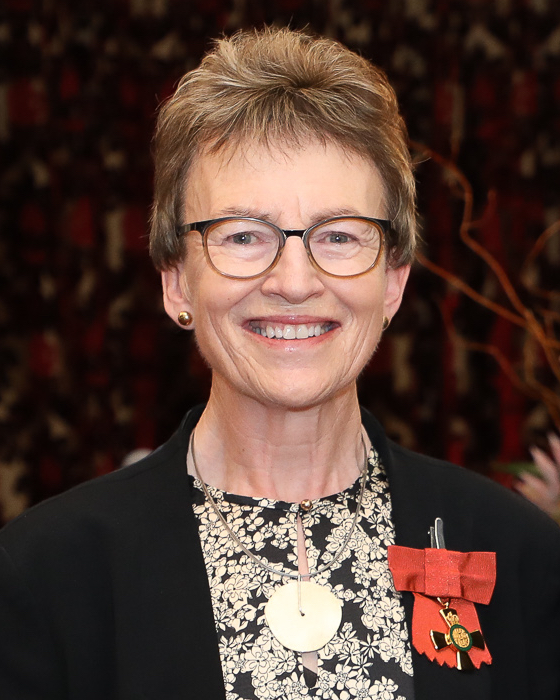
Anne Urlwin

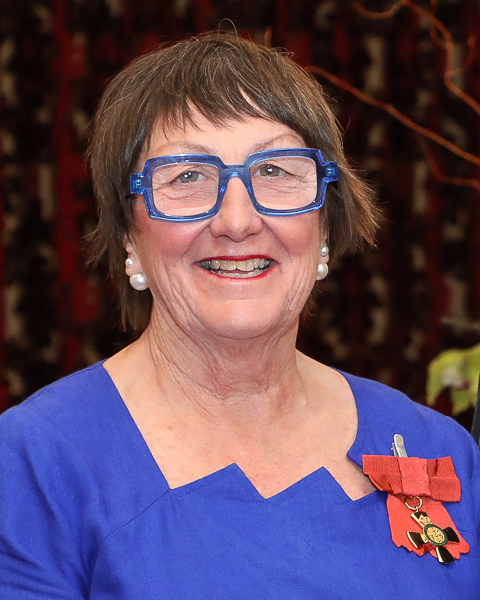
Eileen Varley

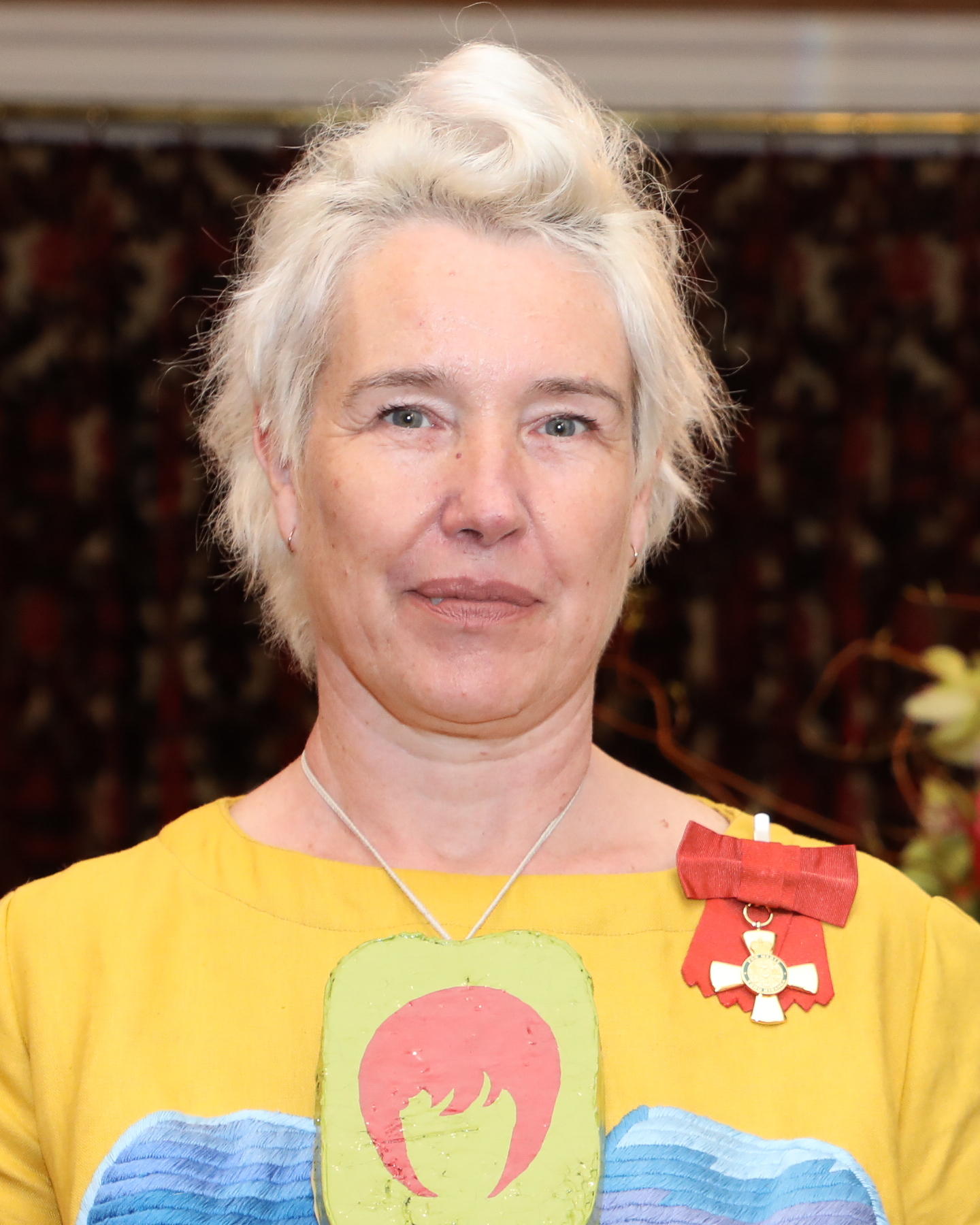
Lisa Walker

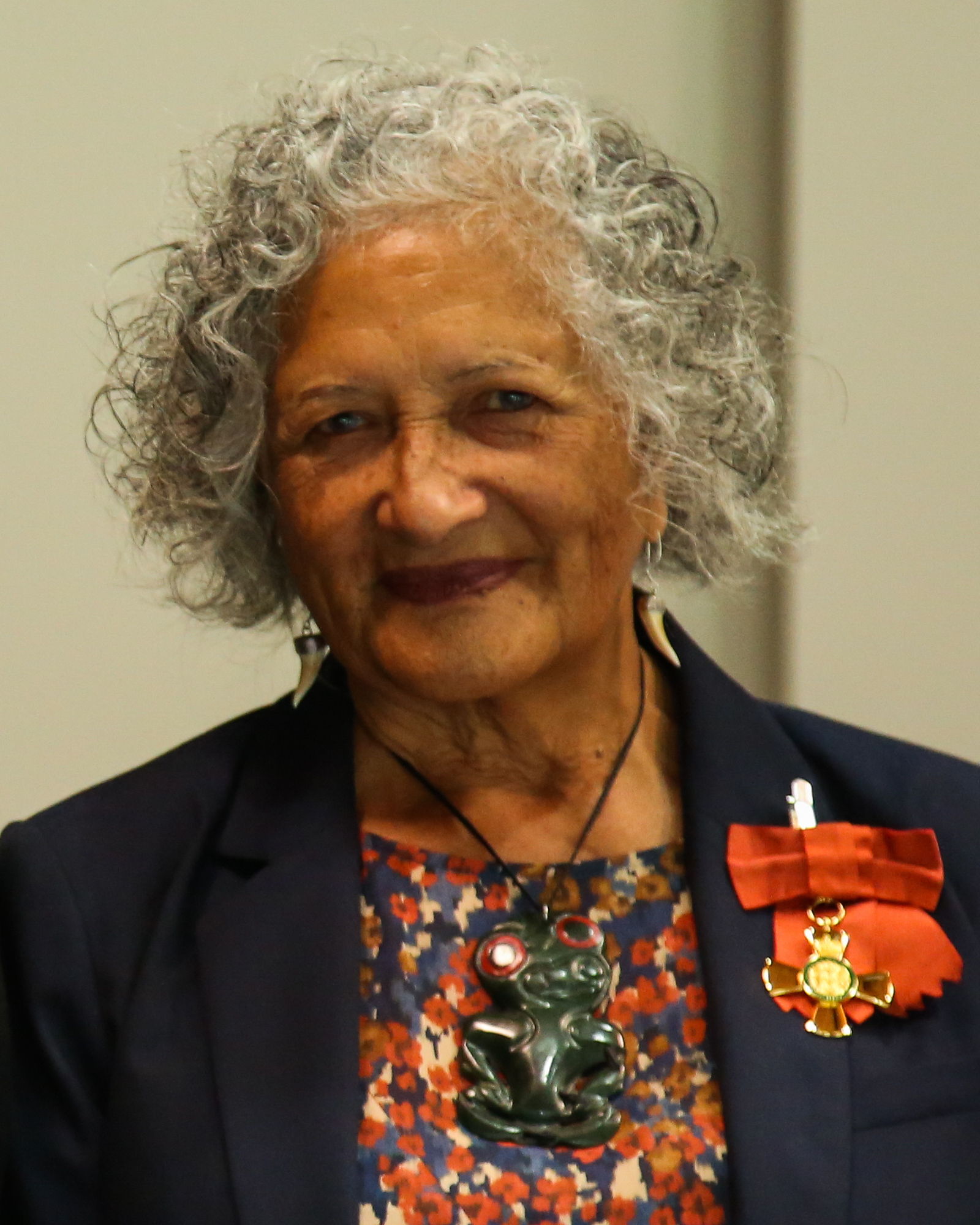
Hera White

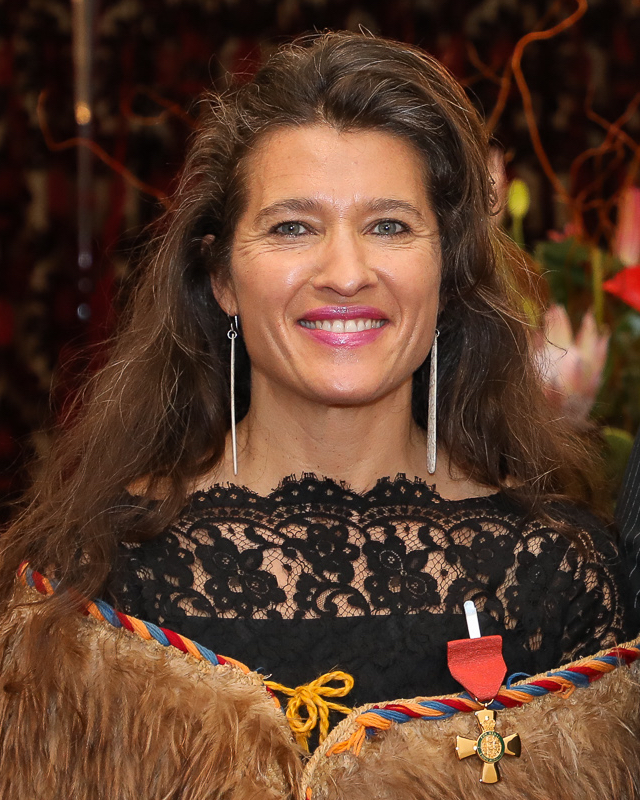
Chelsea Winstanley

=== Member (MNZM) ===
- Melegalenuu Ah Sam – of Papatoetoe. For services to Pacific language education.
- Nicholas Stuart Atkins JP – of Bishopdale. For services to science and the community.
- Lesi Ruby (Les Lehi Tenise) Atoni – of Porirua. For services to the Tokelau community.
- David Lindsay Ayers – of Rangiora. For services to local government and the community.
- John Stephen Baird – of Fairhall. For services to business and governance.
- Carol Anne Kahutaha Berghan – of Kaitaia. For services to Māori.
- John Tyson Bezett – of Dunedin. For services to sport and recreation.
- Anne Marie Biggs – of Saint Heliers. For services to education.
- Noel Brian Birchall – of Kaikohe. For services to outdoor recreation and conservation.
- Sandra Joy Borland – of Georgetown. For services to nursing and the Pacific community.
- Matthew Faafetai Malietoa Brown – of Broomfield. For services to mental health and the prevention of family violence.
- Sarah Clare Brown – of Broomfield. For services to mental health and the prevention of family violence.
- Christopher Bruce Chilton – of Waikiwi. For services to music and journalism.
- Inspector Dean Murray Clifford – of Parkvale. For services to the New Zealand Police and the community.
- Robyn Marire Harriet Corrigan – of Kaitaia. For services to social work.
- Adrienne Kathryn Dalton JP – of Miranda. For services to conservation and youth.
- Detective Inspector David de Lange – of Hastings. For services to the New Zealand Police and the community.
- Reverend Louise Margaret Deans – of Darfield. For services to the community and women.
- Hurimoana Nui Dennis – of Avondale. For services to Māori and the community.
- Makareta Mamoa Willow Desai – of Manaia. For services to Fire and Emergency New Zealand and the community.
- Christopher James Ellison – of Mosman Park, Western Australia. For services to New Zealand–Australia relations.
- Ross Duncan Everiss – of Lynmore. For services to rugby.
- Siaosi Fa'alogo – of Porirua. For services to the New Zealand Police and the community.
- Elizabeth Ann Forgie – of Ōkaihau. For services to education.
- Margaret Letitia Fraser – of Dunedin. For services to hepatology.
- Maha Tawfek Hassan Galal – of Avonhead. For services to the Muslim community.
- Richard Patrick Garratt – of Mount Maunganui. For services to tennis and Māori sport.
- Jennifer Mary Gordon – of Waikanae Beach. For services to Catholic education.
- Dianne Kay Grennell – of Waikanae. For services to Māori and the Public Service.
- Elizabeth Anne Hakaraia – of Ōtaki Beach. For services to the film and media industries.
- Marianne Hargreaves – of Burnside. For services to the arts.
- Dr Ella Yvette Henry – of Te Atatū South. For services to Māori, education and media.
- Bryan Mervyn Ernest Hocken – of Inglewood. for services to agriculture and the rural community.
- Gregory Bernard Horton – of Remuera. For services to philanthropy and governance.
- Dr Josephine Harle Howse – of Kohimarama. For services to education.
- Dr Beverley Lorraine James – of Spring Creek. For services to seniors.
- Estelle Pura Leask – of Bluff. For services to conservation and Māori.
- Dr Linita Manu'atu – of Ponsonby. For services to Pacific education and the Tongan community.
- Paul Ernest McEwan – of Wānaka. For services to neonatal care.
- Kiriovea Jasmin McSweeney – of Eastbourne. For services to the film industry.
- Dr Robert John McNeill Mills – of New Plymouth. For services to wildlife conservation.
- Sharon Louise Morgan – of Langs Beach. For services to the community, the arts and rugby.
- Walter Ngakoma Ngamane – of Thames. For services to Māori and tourism.
- Hai Dinh Nguyen – of Emerald Hill. For services to refugees and the Vietnamese community.
- Anna Elizabeth Osborne – of Dobson. For services to the community and occupational health and safety.
- Tolupene Peau – of Titirangi. For services to the Tokelau community.
- Jo Mere Pilkington – of Northcote. For services to the events sector and the community.
- Grace Elizabeth Prendergast – of Cambridge, United Kingdom. For services to rowing.
- Kenneth Alan Rintoul – of Ōkaihau. For services to governance and the community.
- Holly Irene Robinson – of Calton Hill. For services to athletics.
- Sonya Lynne Rockhouse – of Hoon Hay. For services to the community and occupational health and safety.
- Karla Anne Sanders – of Alexandra. For services to bullying prevention.
- Kim Shannon – of Ngaio. For services to education and the public service.
- Deidre Ann Shea – of Freemans Bay. For services to education.
- Stacey Anne Shortall – of Hataitai. For services to the law and the community.
- Hugh Edwin Stringleman – of One Tree Point. For services to agricultural journalism.
- Mark Robertson Sutton – of Te Anau. For services to conservation.
- Dr Mai Mohammed Hamdi Tamimi – of Hebron, Palestine. For services to ethnic communities.
- Teaiorangi Trevor Taurima – of Whakatu. For services to Māori, sport and conservation.
- Gaylene Katerina Te Rauna – of Berhampore. For services to Māori and disabled people.
- Reverend Victoria Pernel Terrell – of Onehunga. For services to the disability community.
- Margaret Ann Tod – of Takapuna. For services to netball.
- Emma Kimberley Twigg – of Cambridge. For services to rowing.
- Bill Rangi Urale – of Mount Albert. For services to music and the community.
- Henry van Tuel – of Bluff Hill. For services to the Coastguard.
- Cynthia Grace Wallbridge – of Wai o Taiki Bay. For services to dental health and education.
- Patrick John Walsh – of Devonport. For services to education.
- Kerri Leigh Williams – of Cambridge. For services to rowing.
- Keith Lewis Woodley – of Pōkeno. For services to shorebird conservation.

Honorary

- Hans van Ess – of Birkenhead. For services to ju-jitsu.
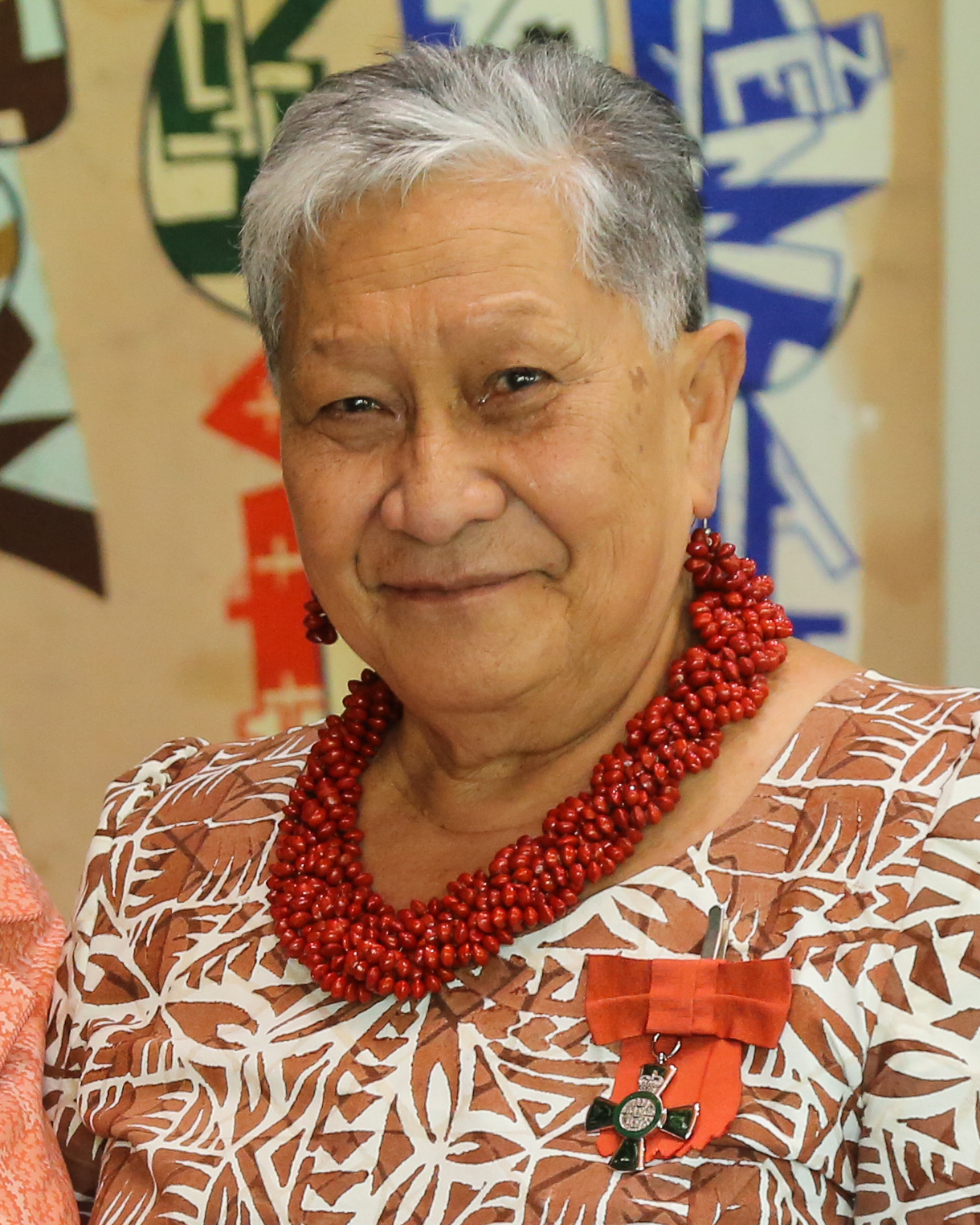
Melegalenuu Ah Sam

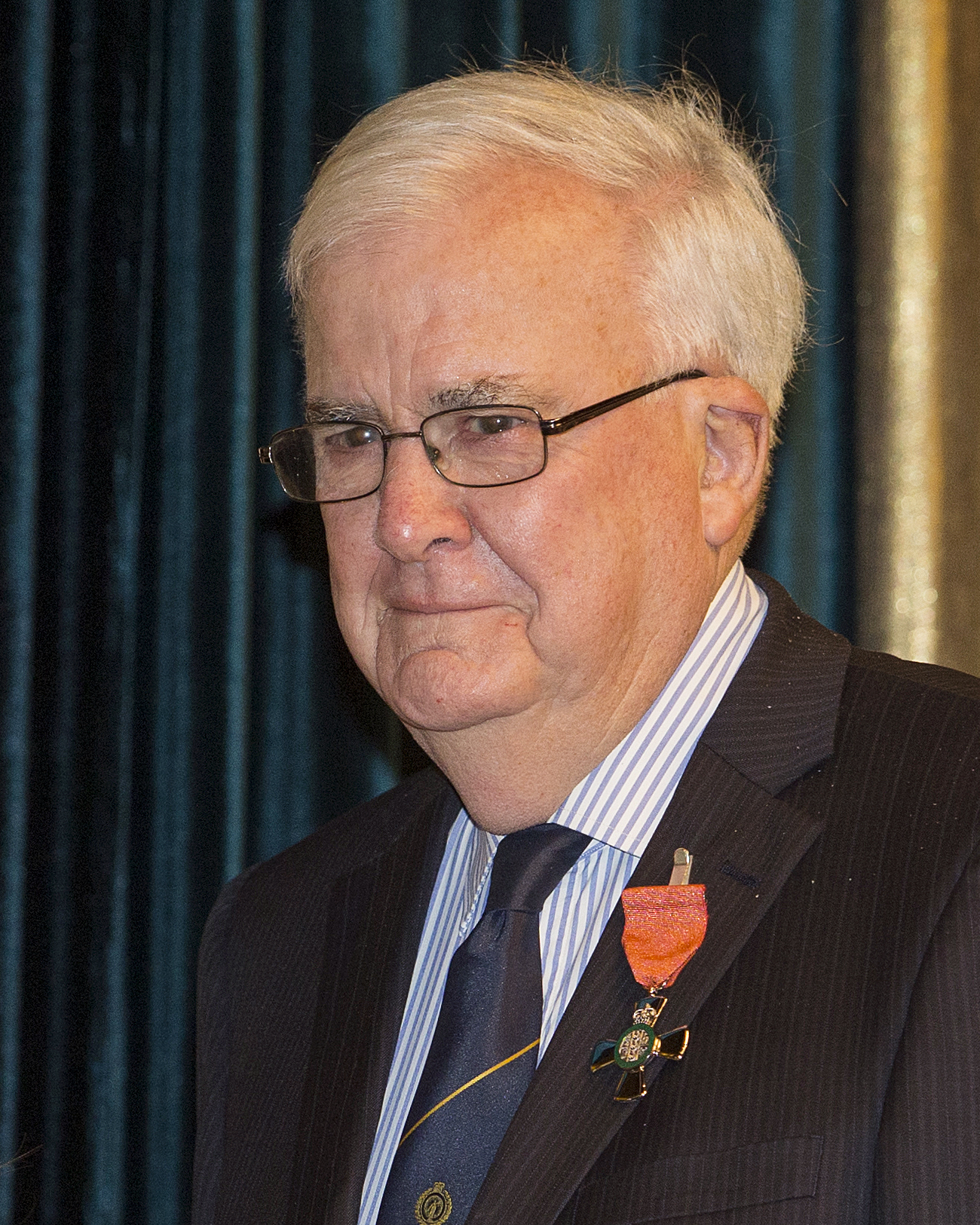
Nicholas Atkins

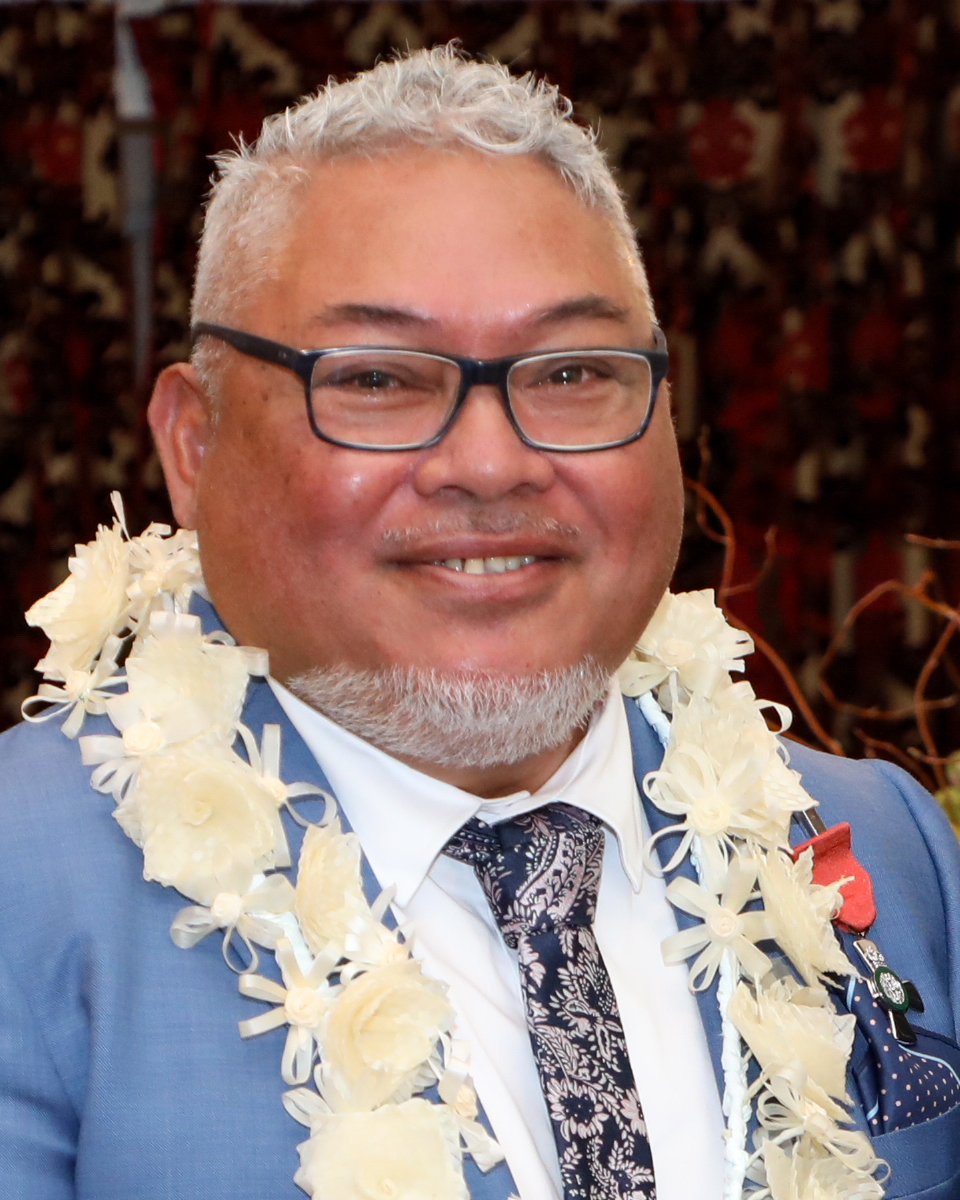
Les Atoni

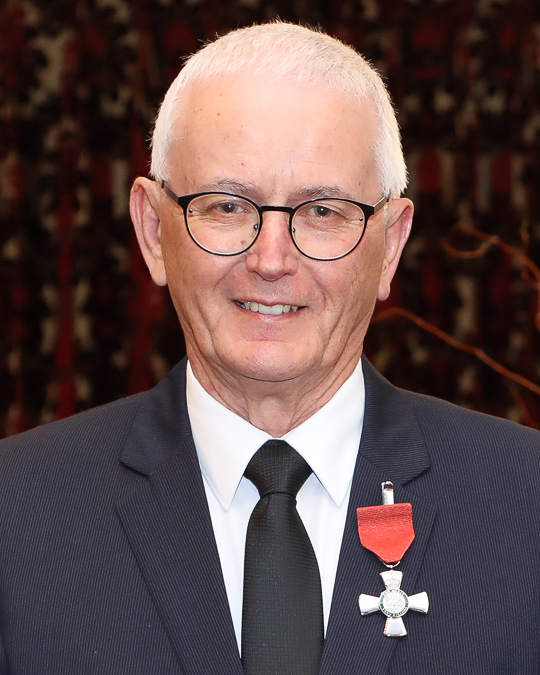
David Ayers

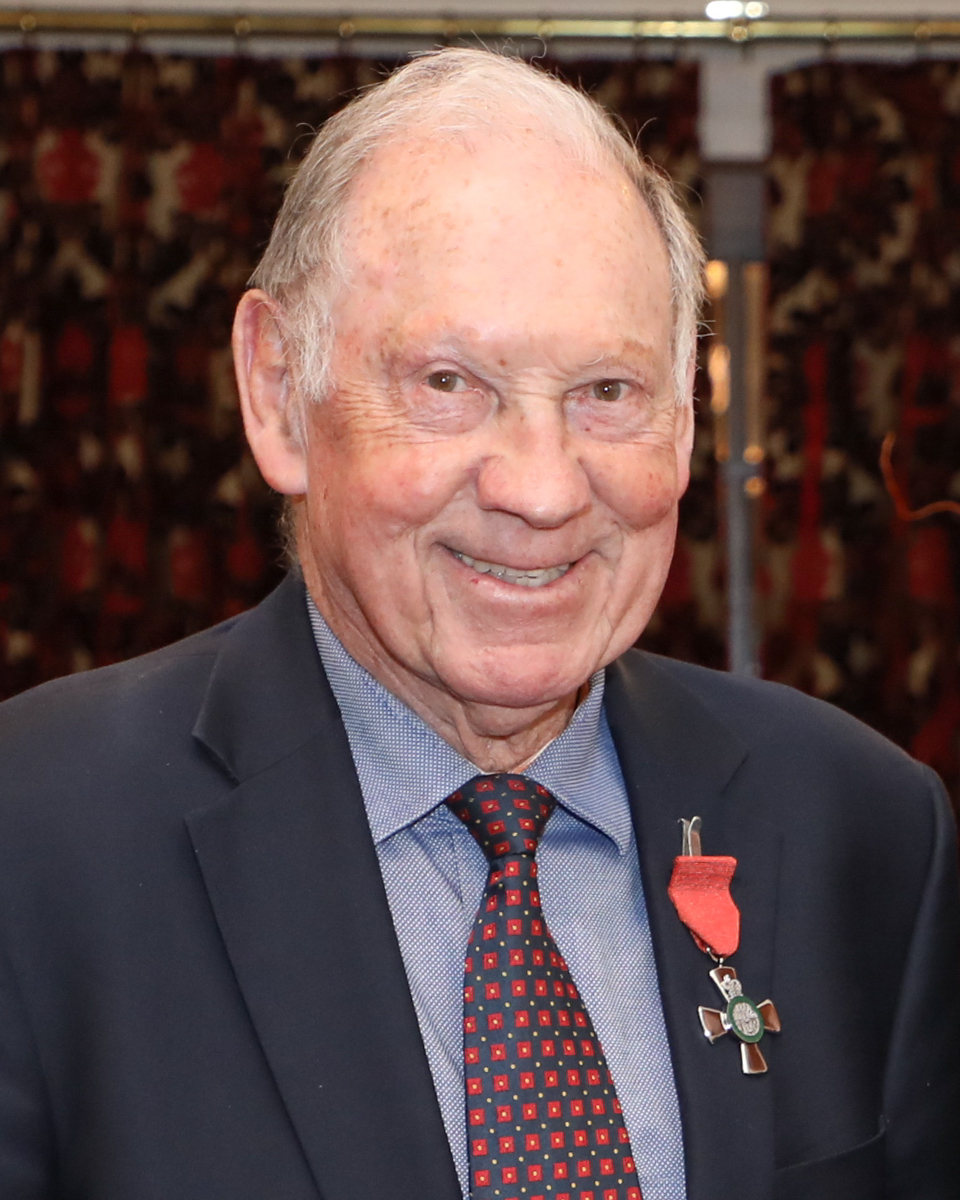
John Baird

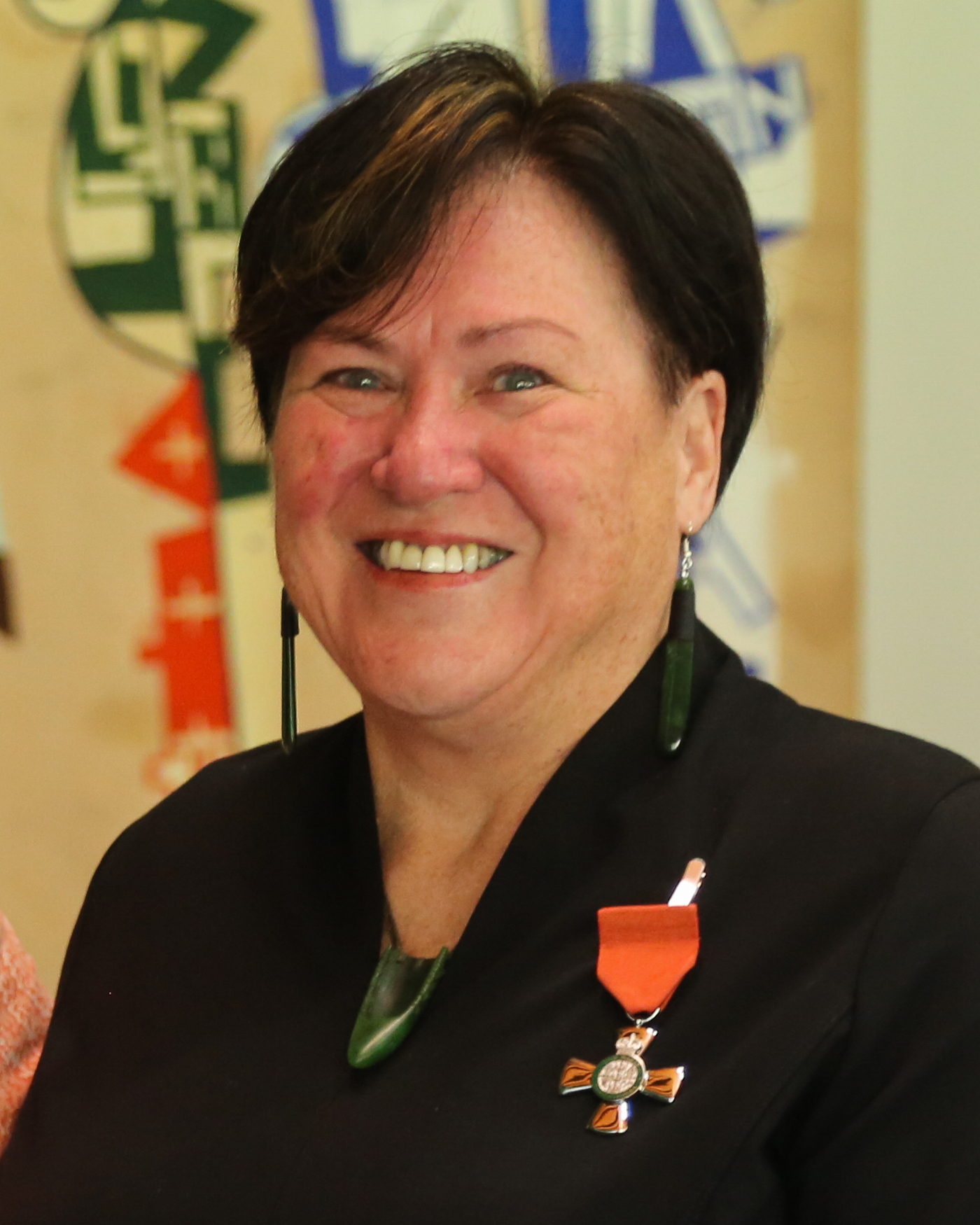
Carol Berghan

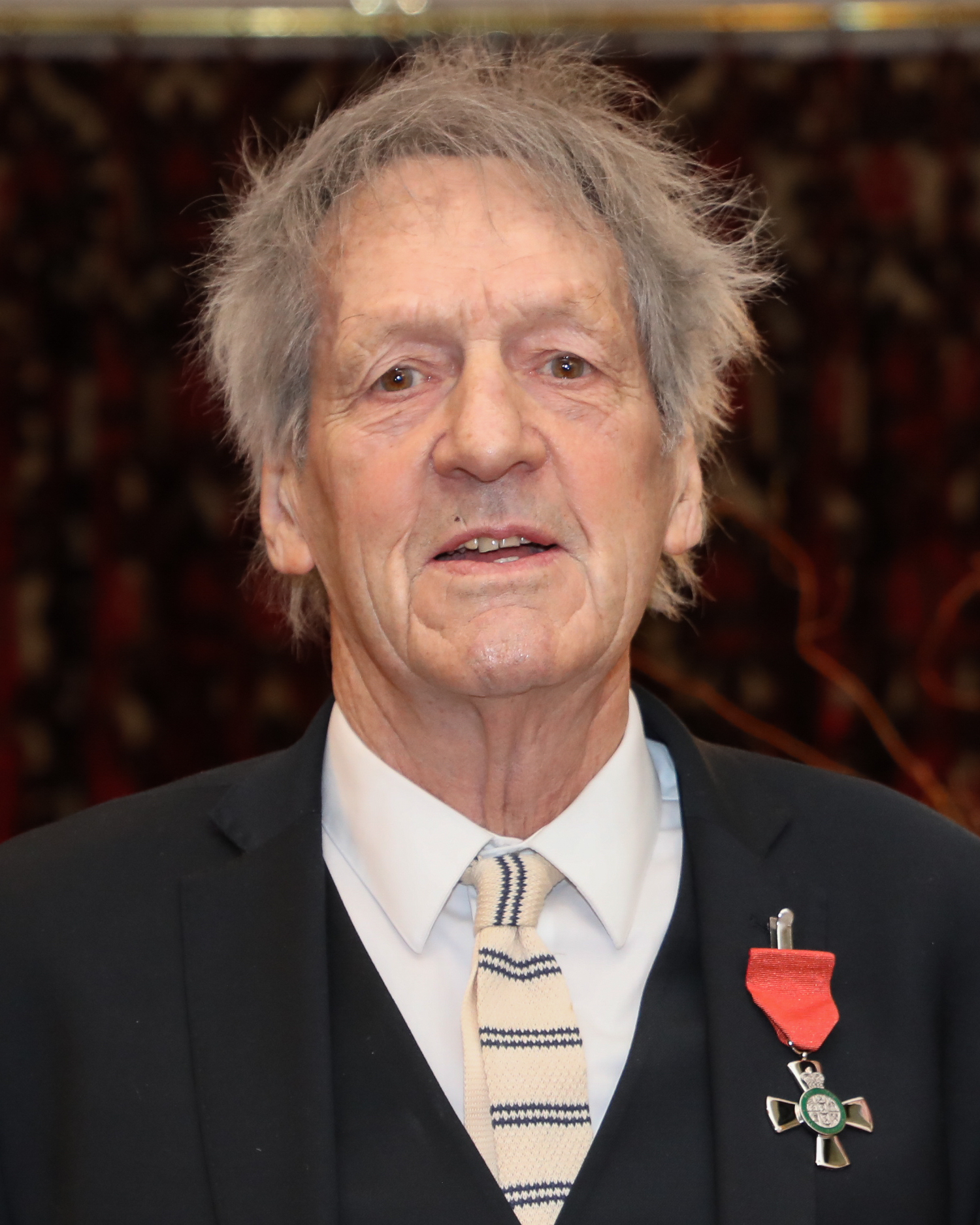
John Bezett

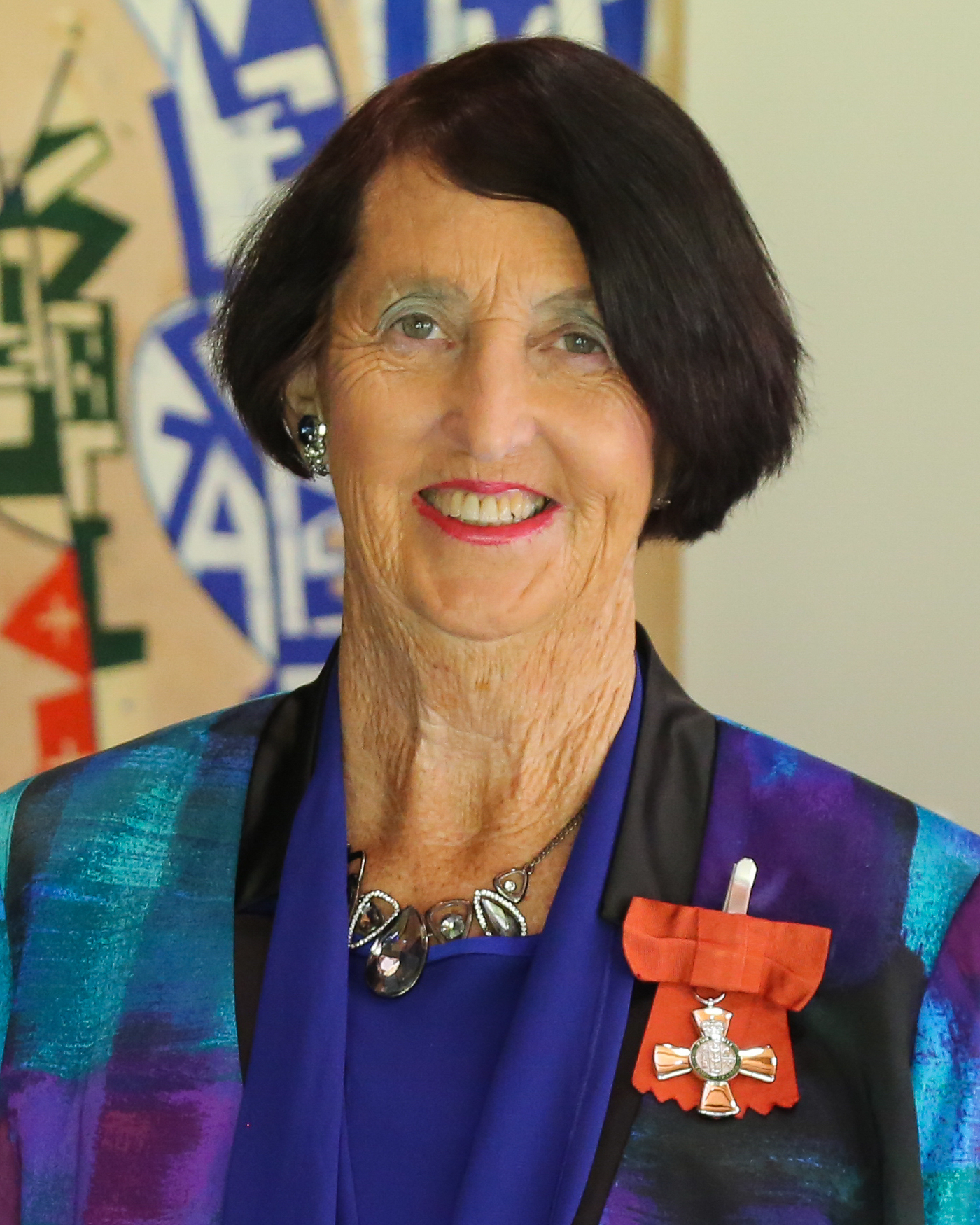
Anne Marie Biggs

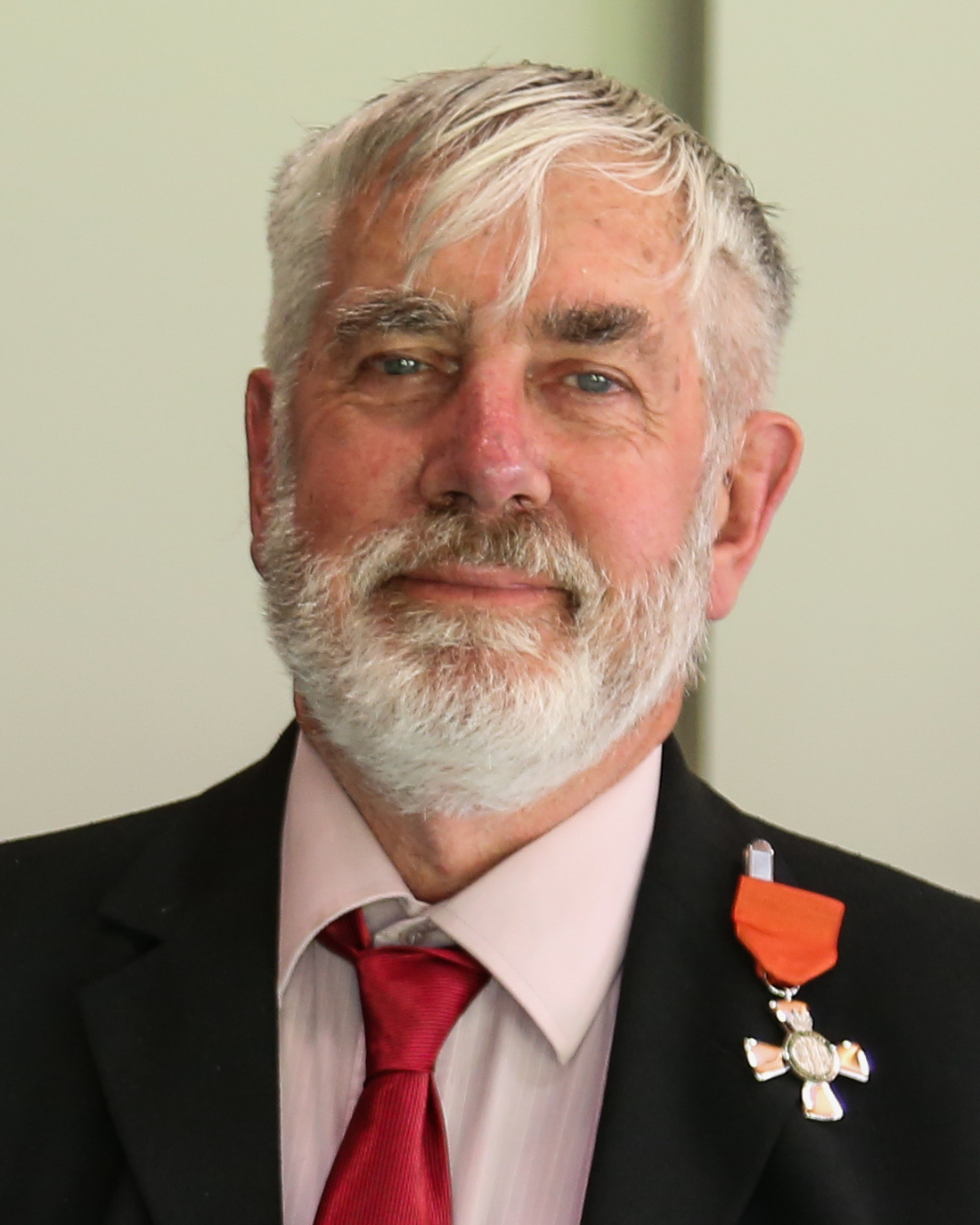
Noel Birchall

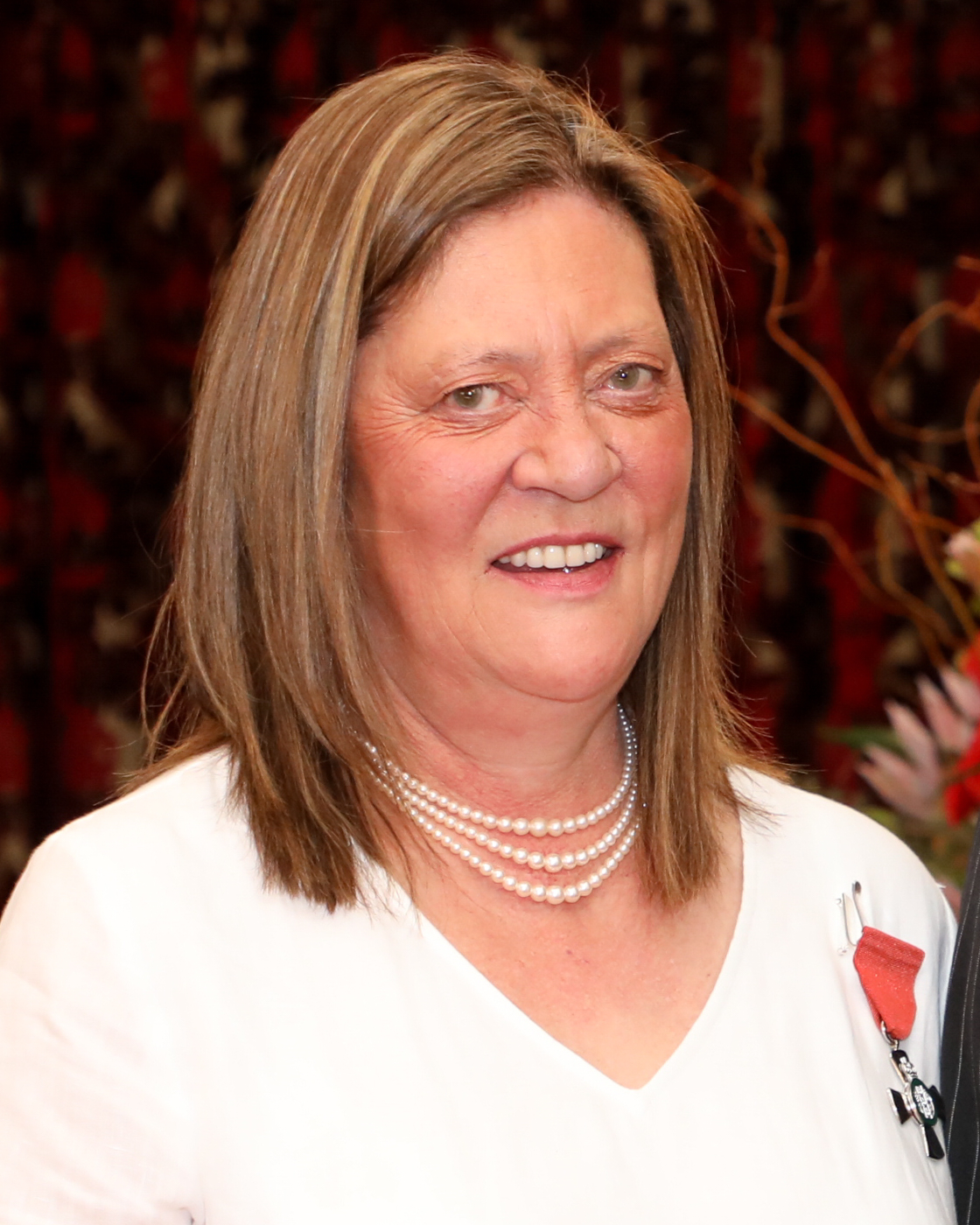
Sandy Borland

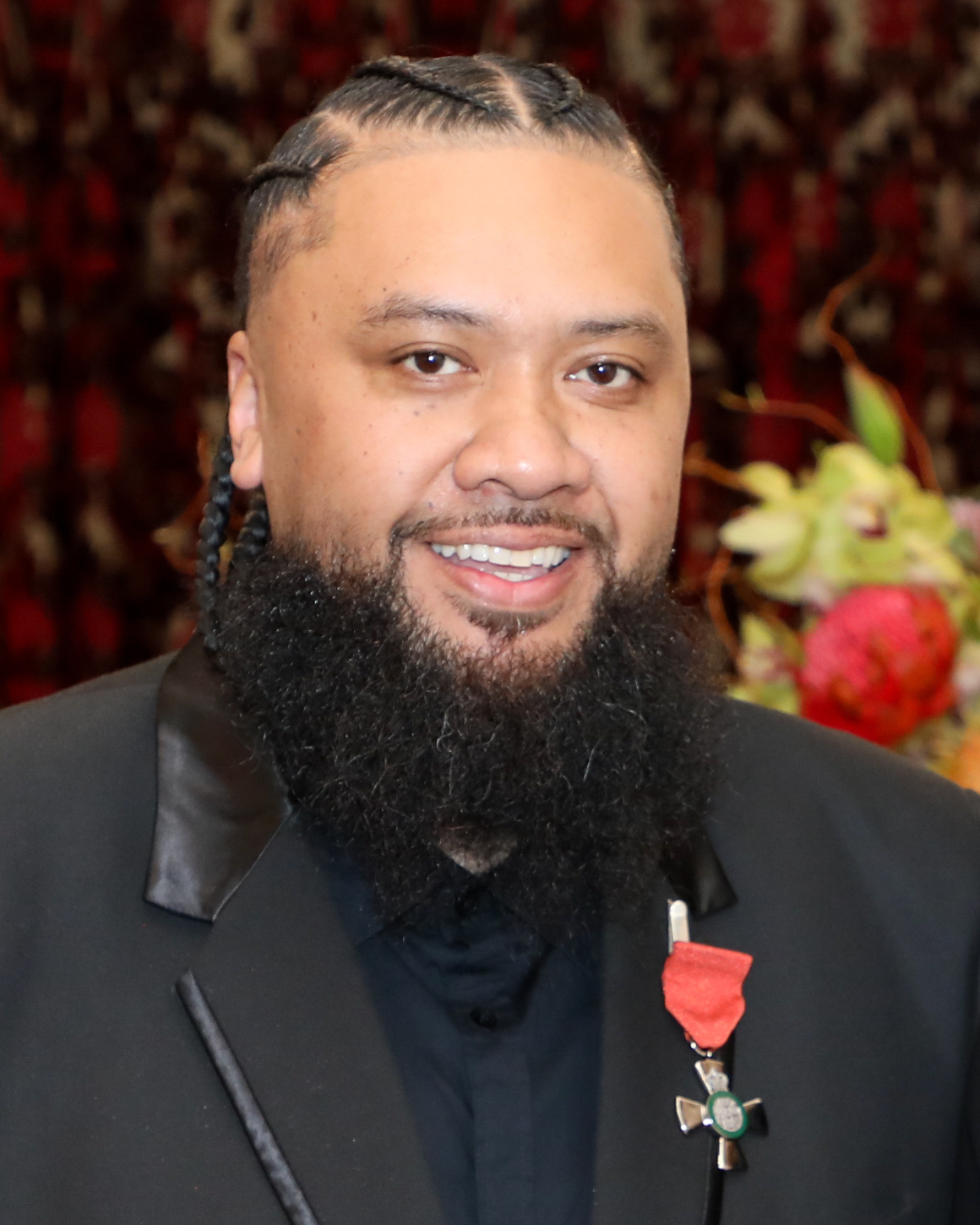
Matt Brown

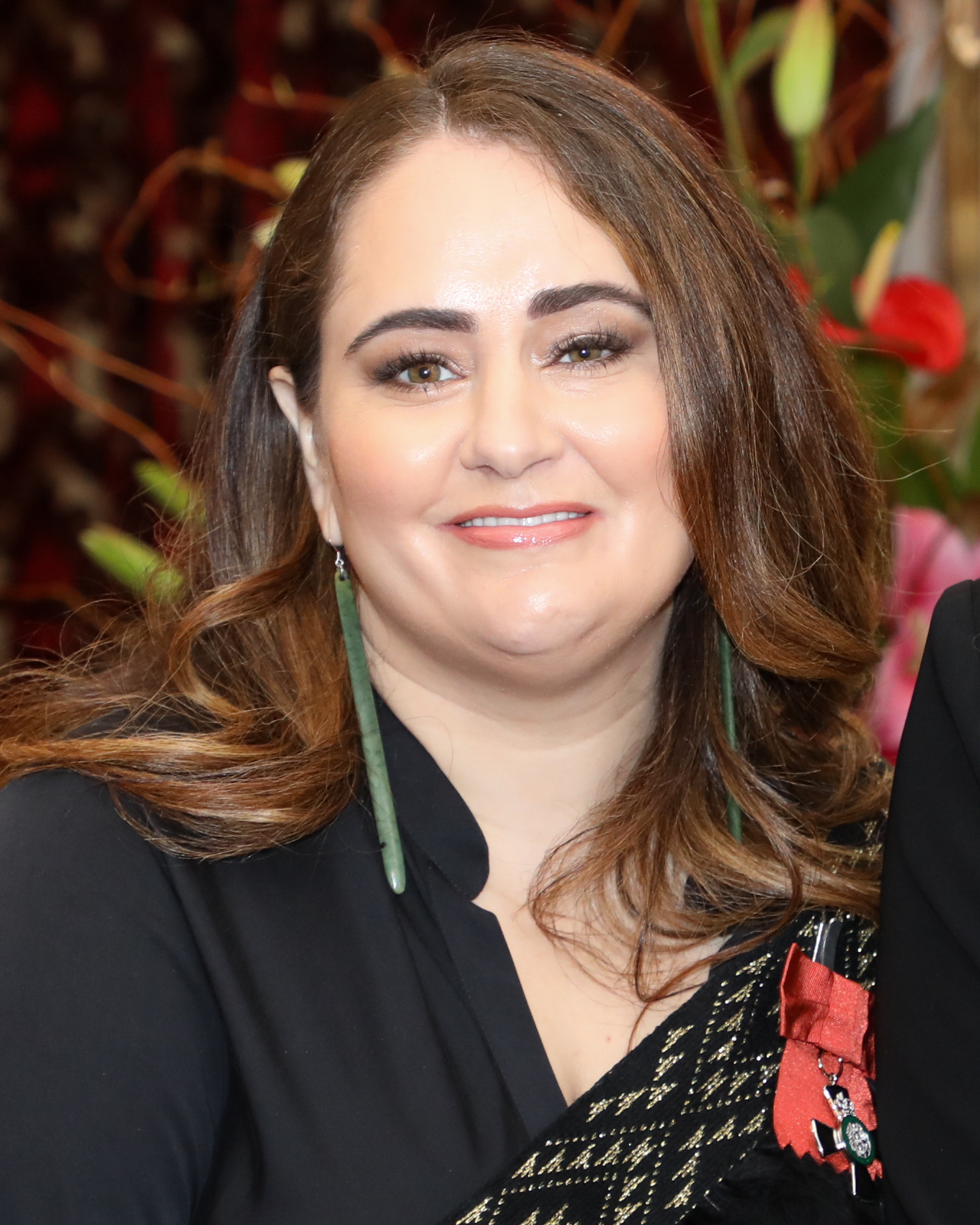
Sarah Brown

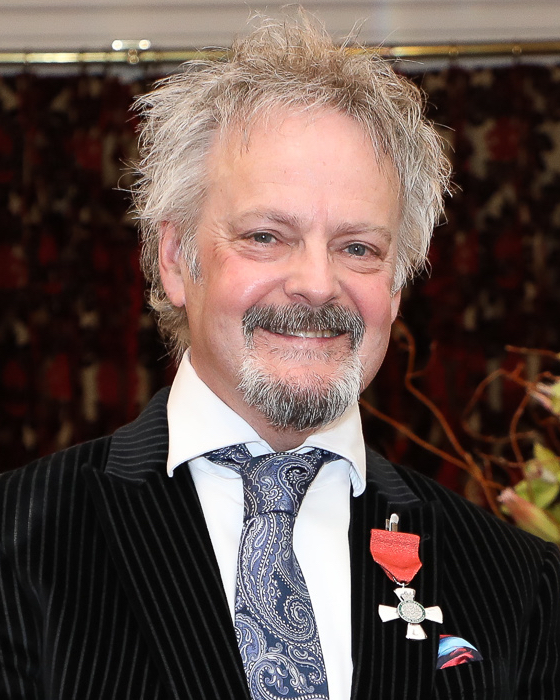
Chris Chilton

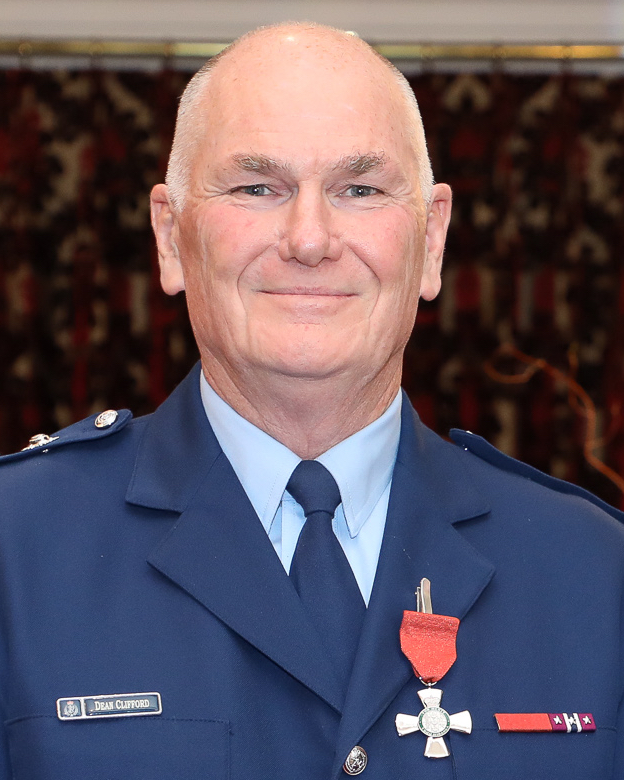
Dean Clifford

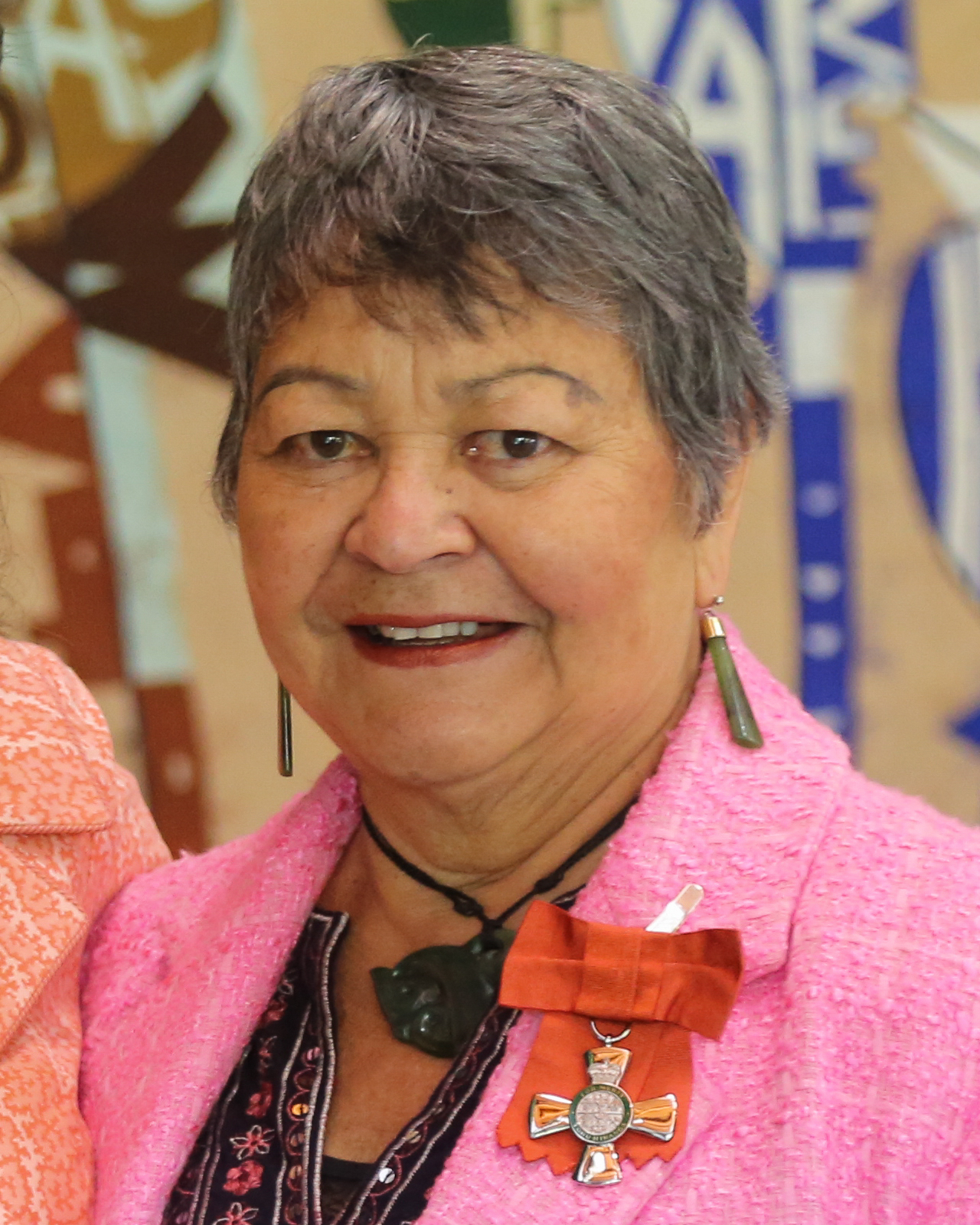
Robyn Corrigan

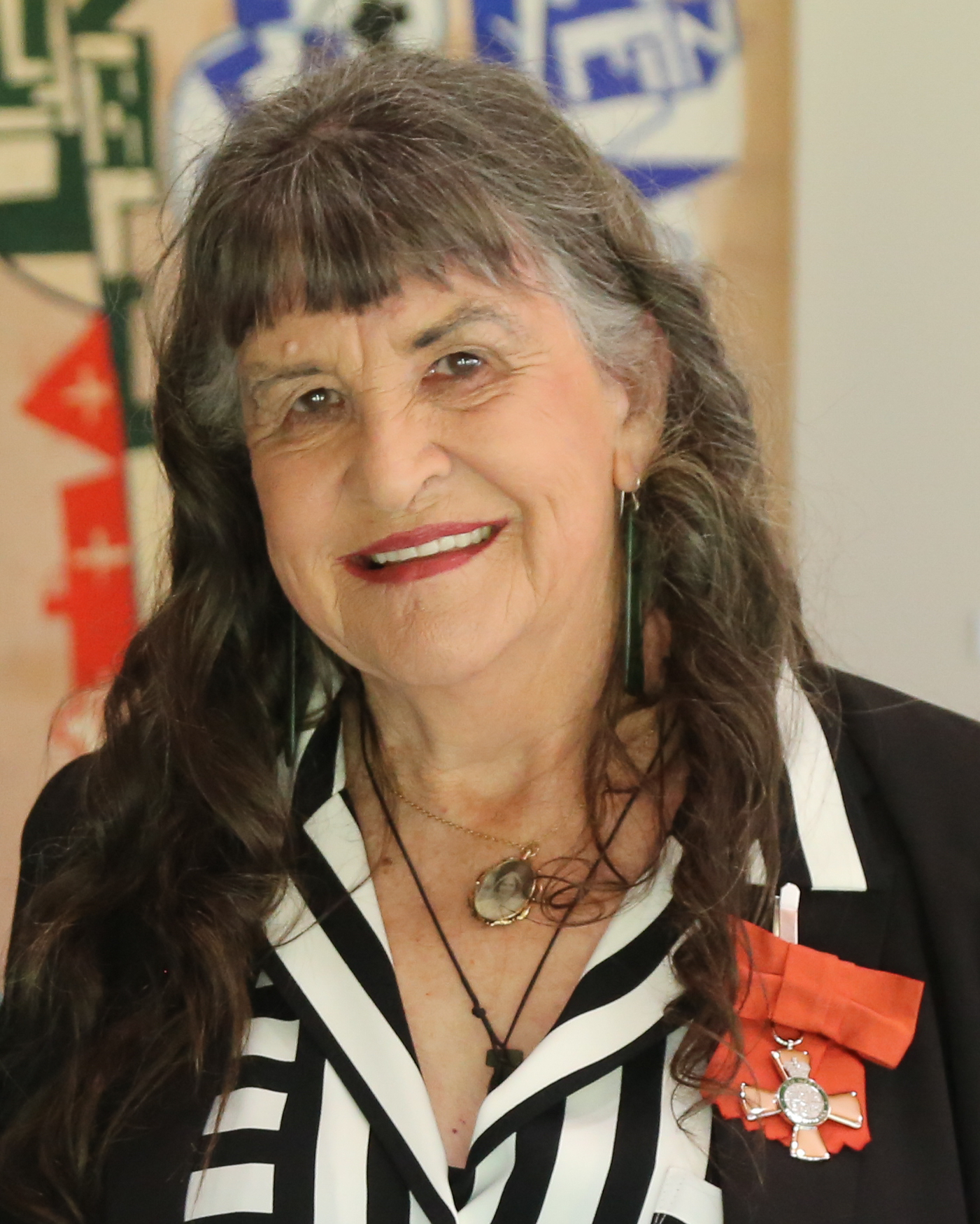
Adrienne Dalton

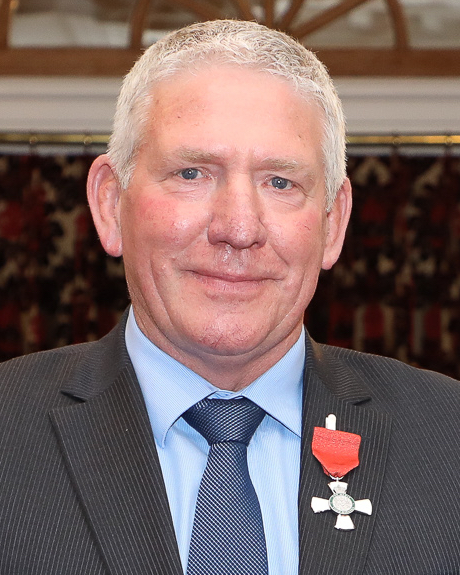
David de Lange

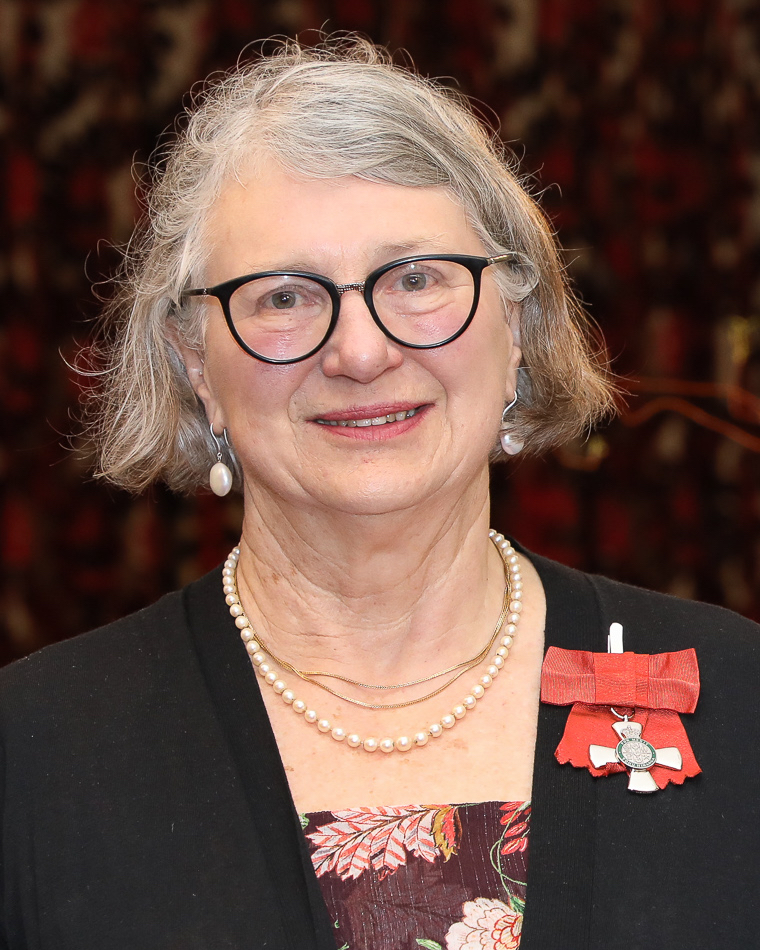
Louise Deans

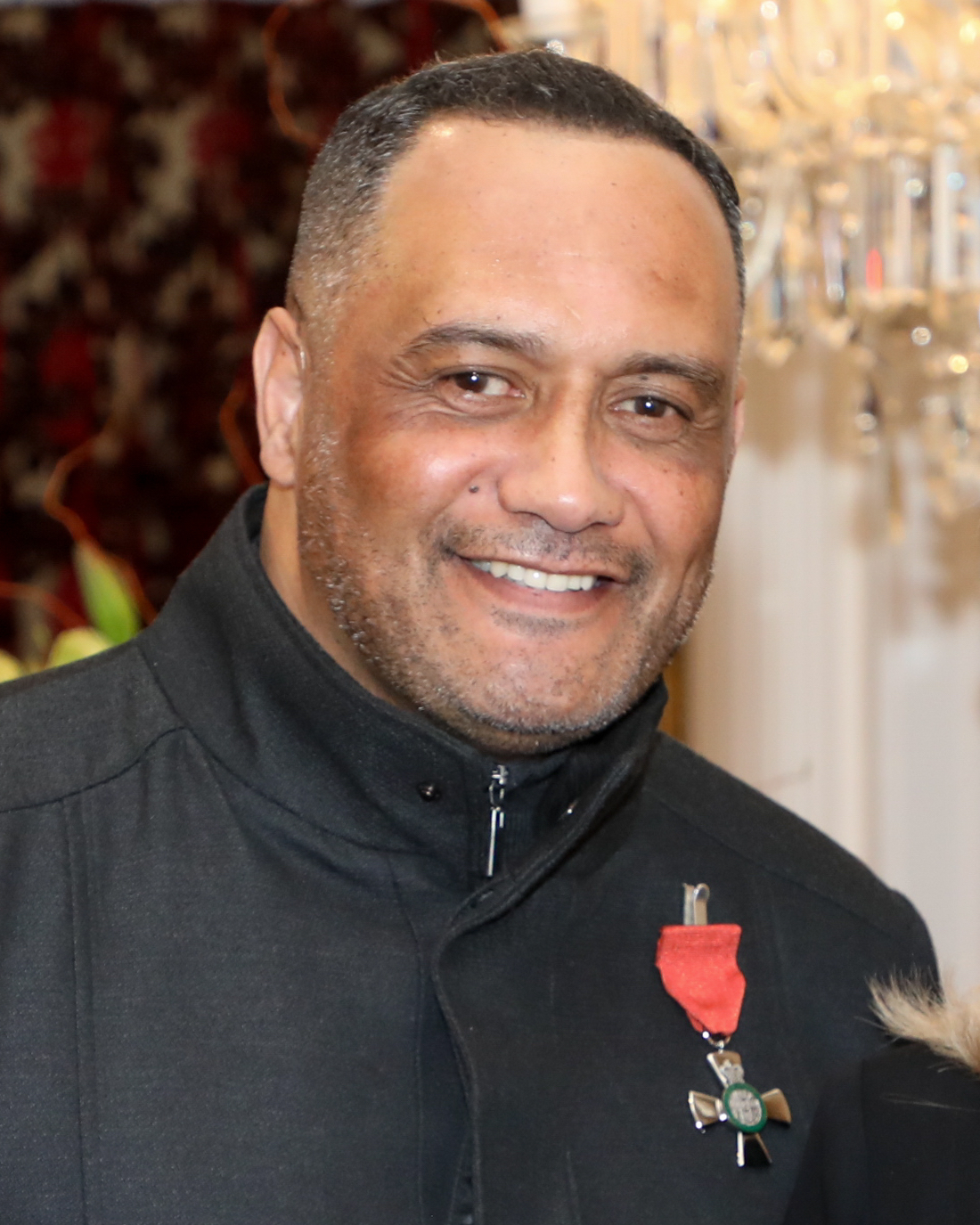
Hurimoana Dennis

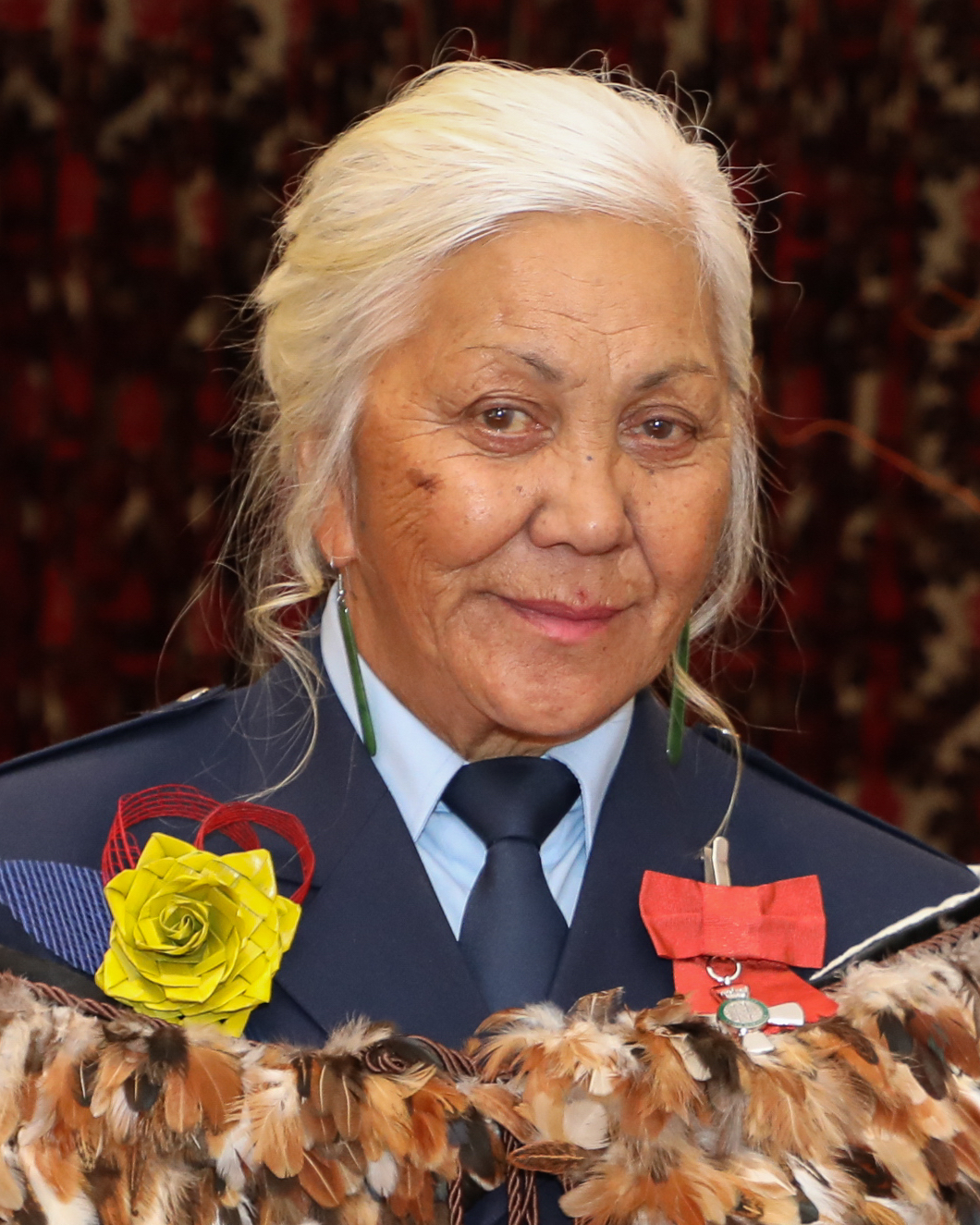
Makareta Desai

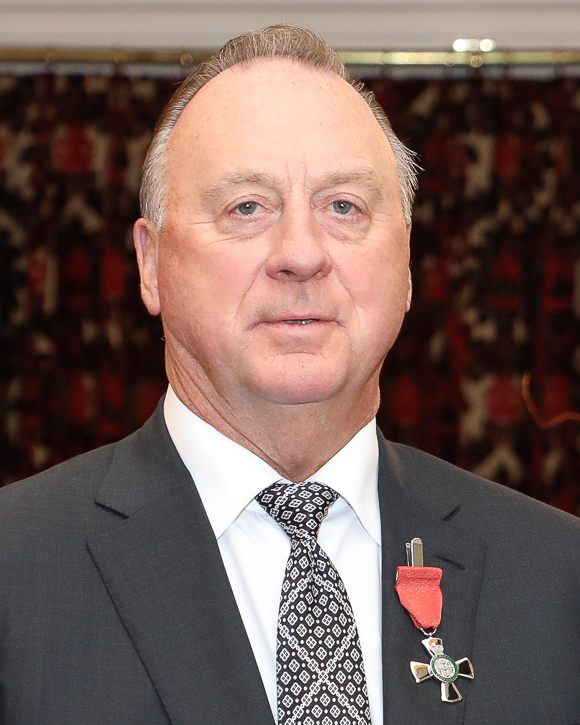
Chris Ellison

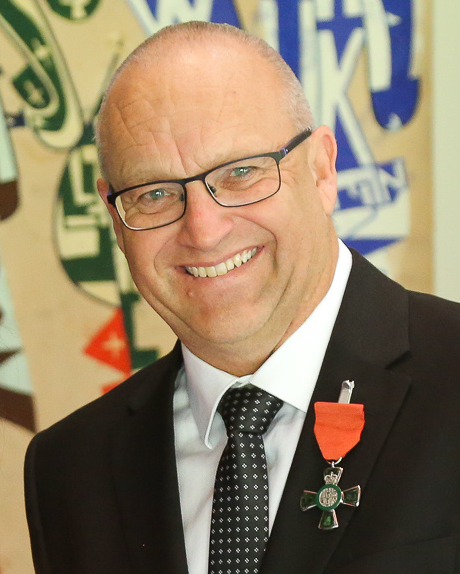
Ross Everiss

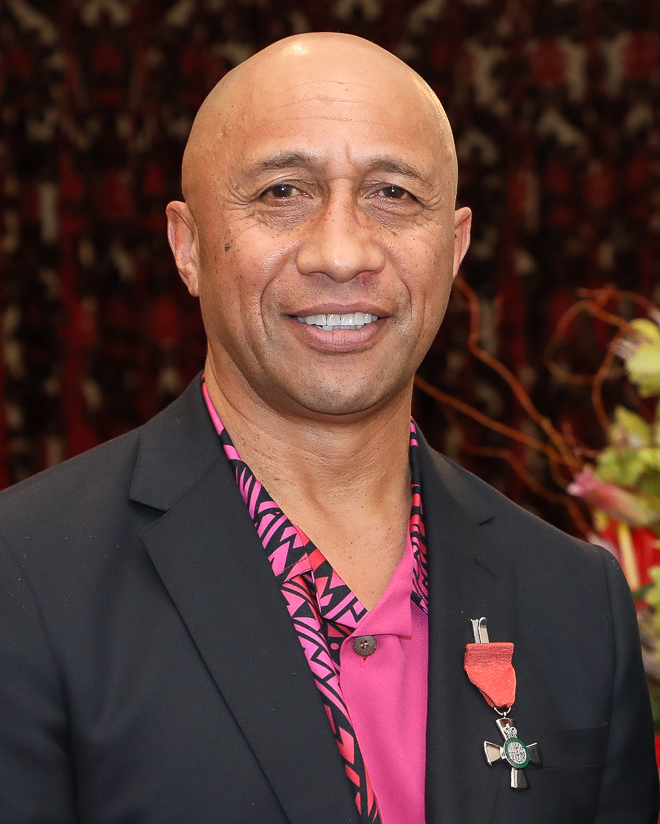
George Fa'alogo

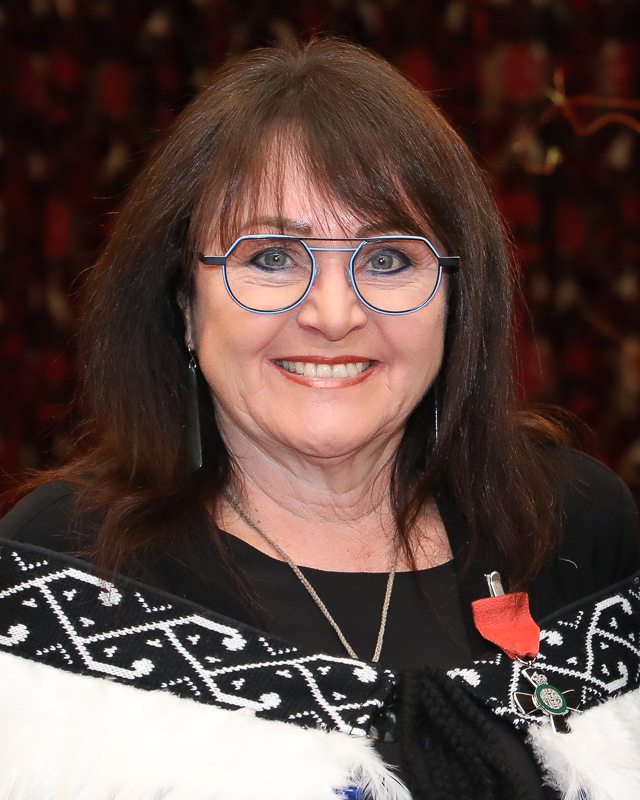
Elizabeth Forgie

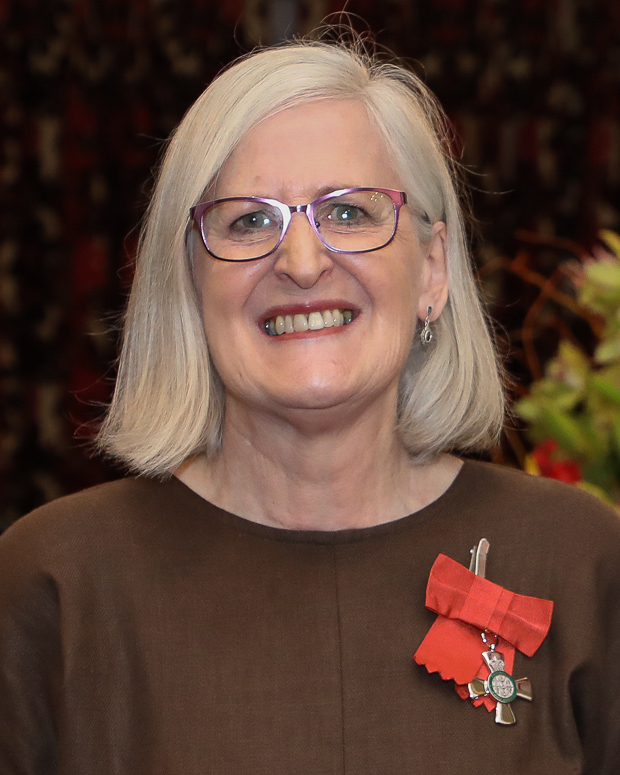
Margaret Fraser

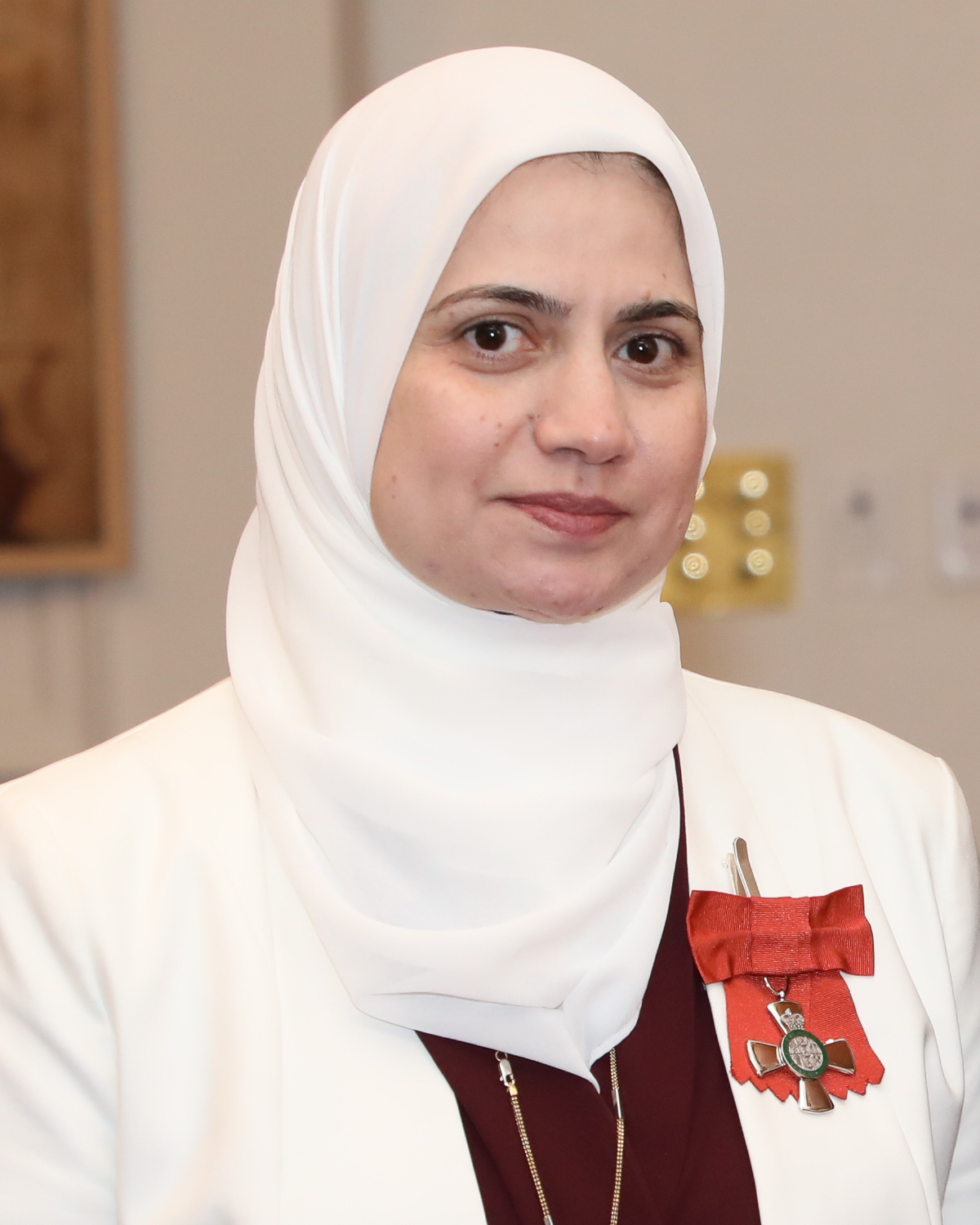
Maha Galal

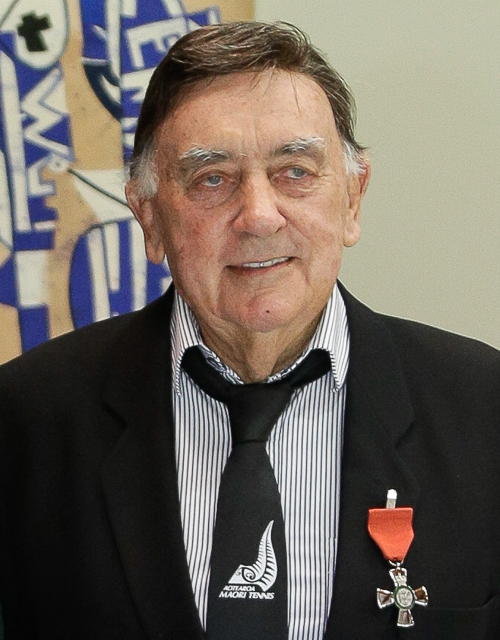
Richard Garratt

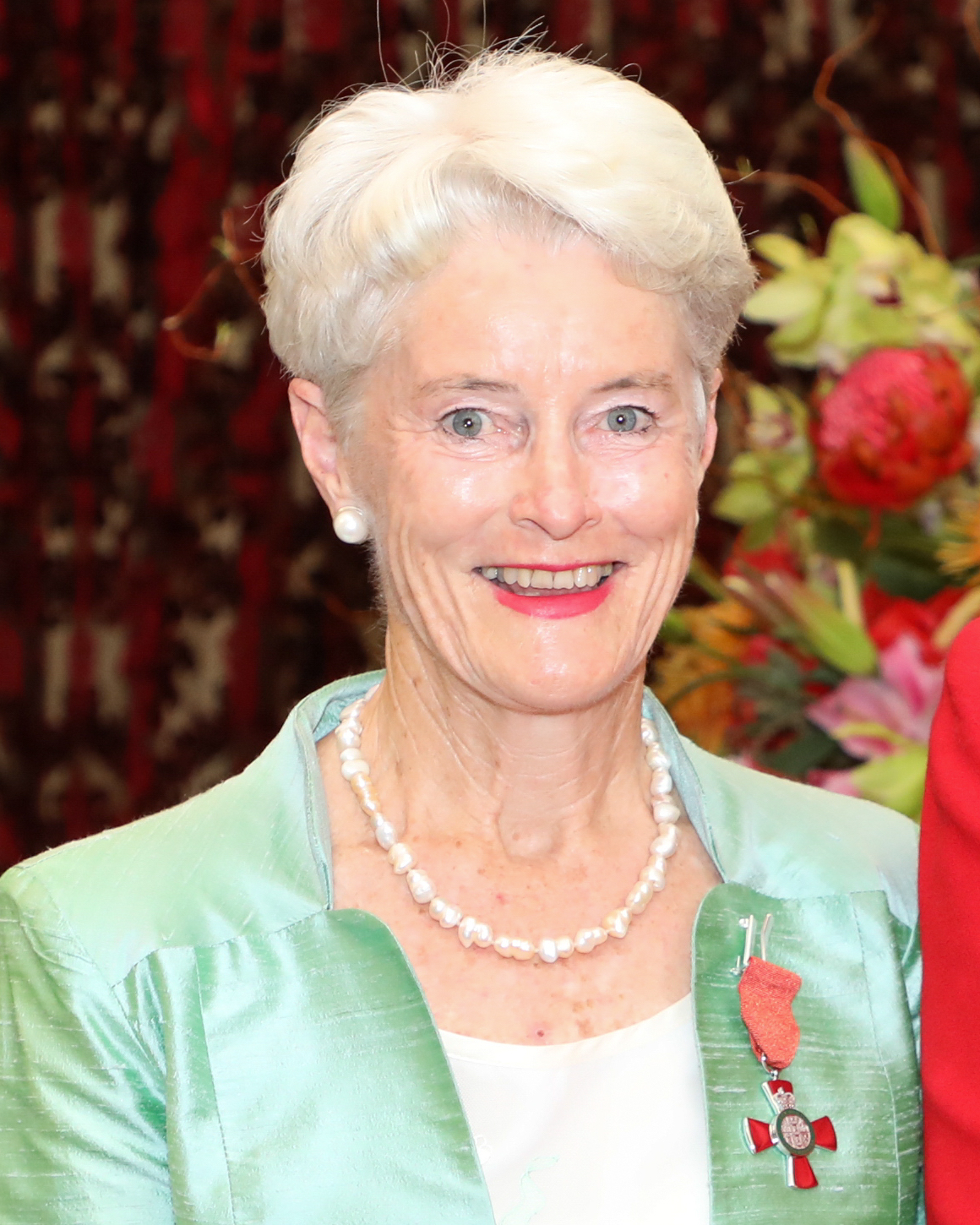
Jenny Gordon

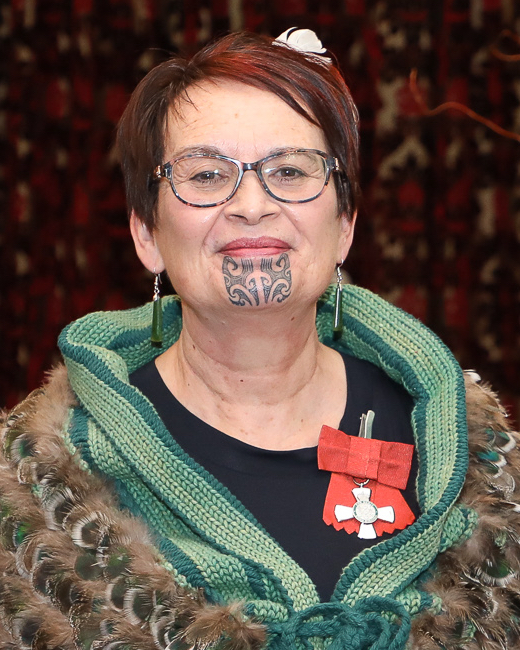
Di Grennell

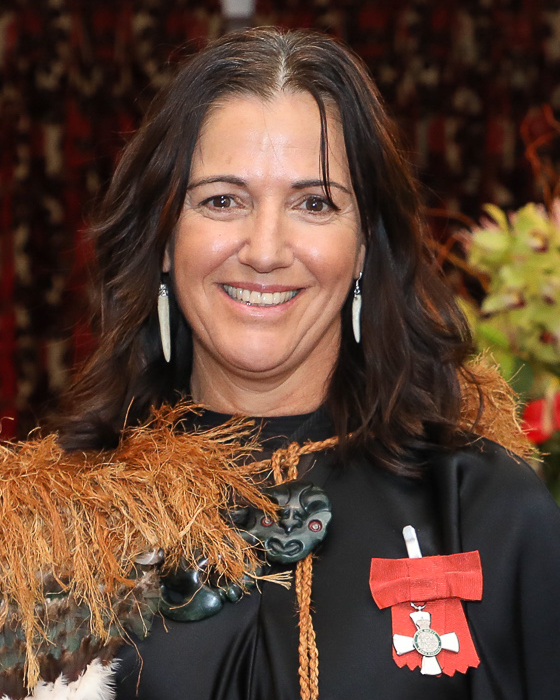
Libby Hakaraia

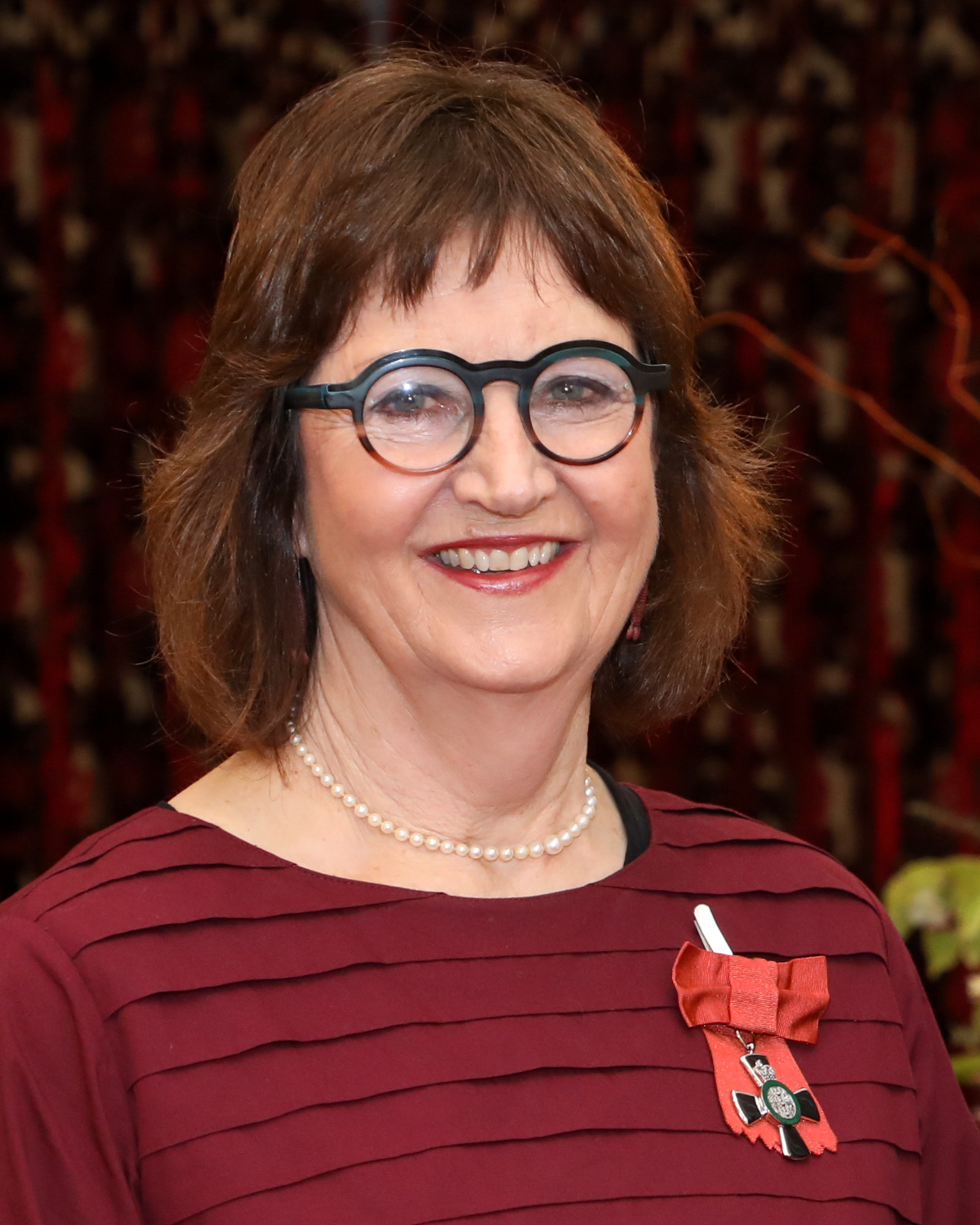
Marianne Hargreaves

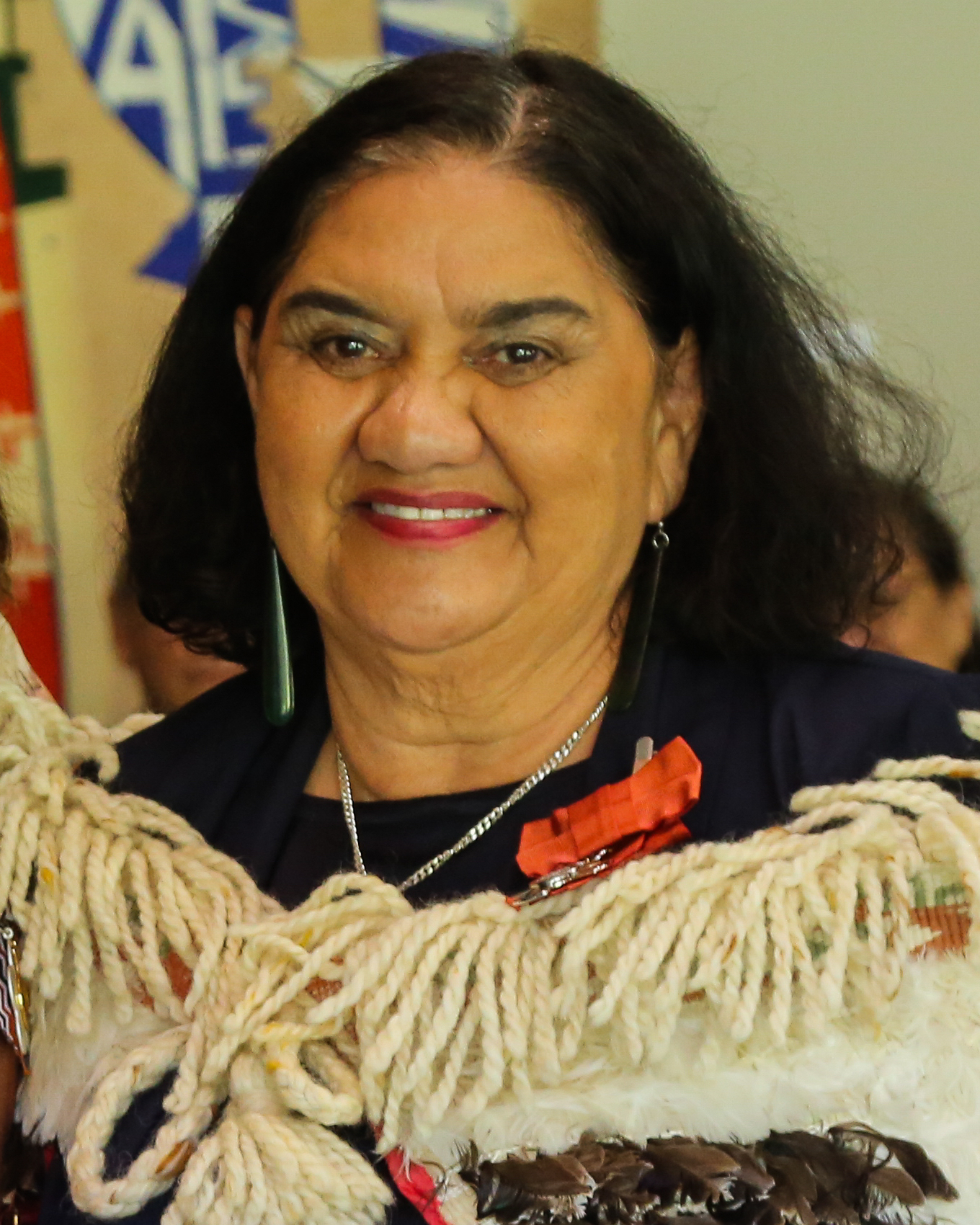
Ella Henry

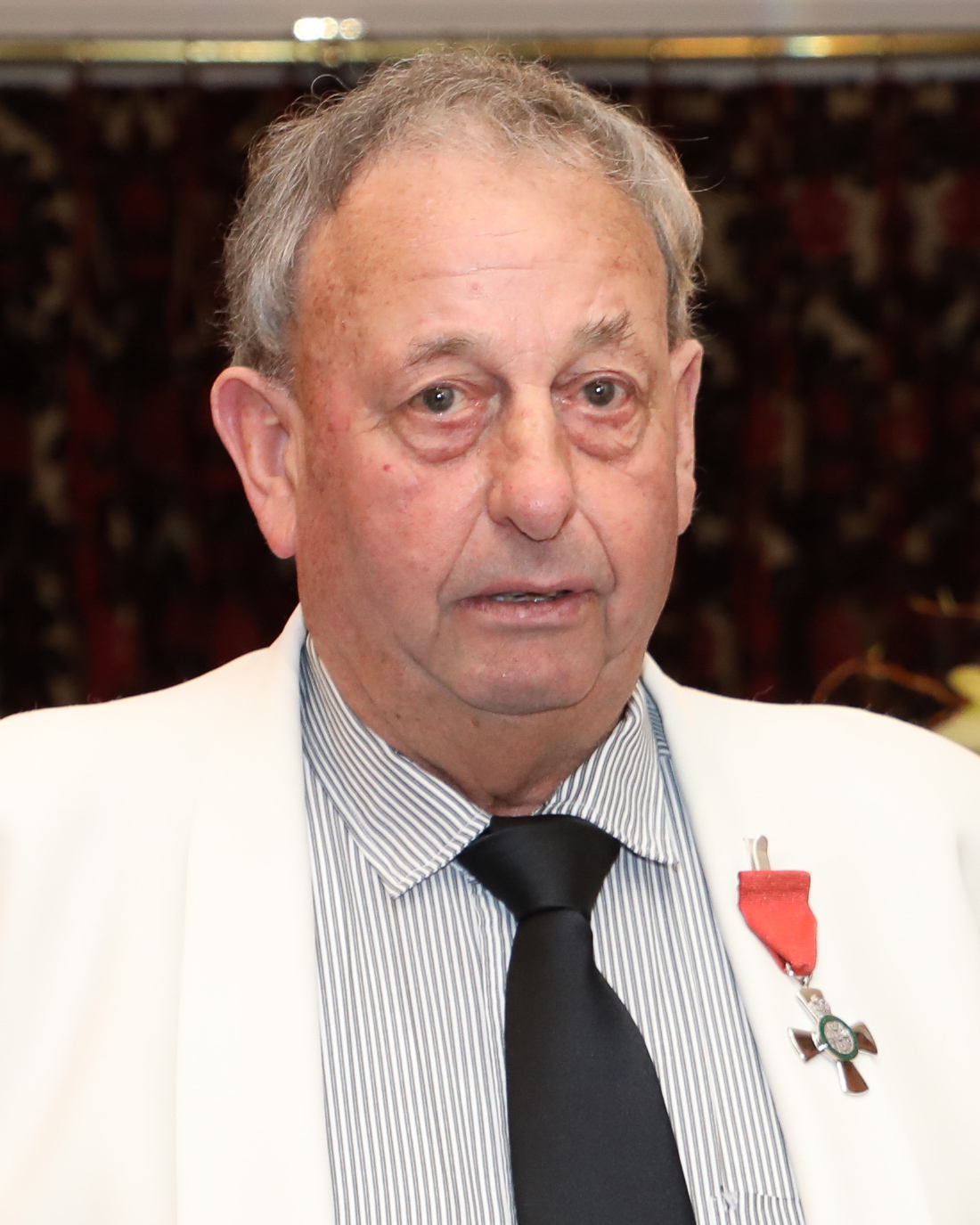
Bryan Hocken

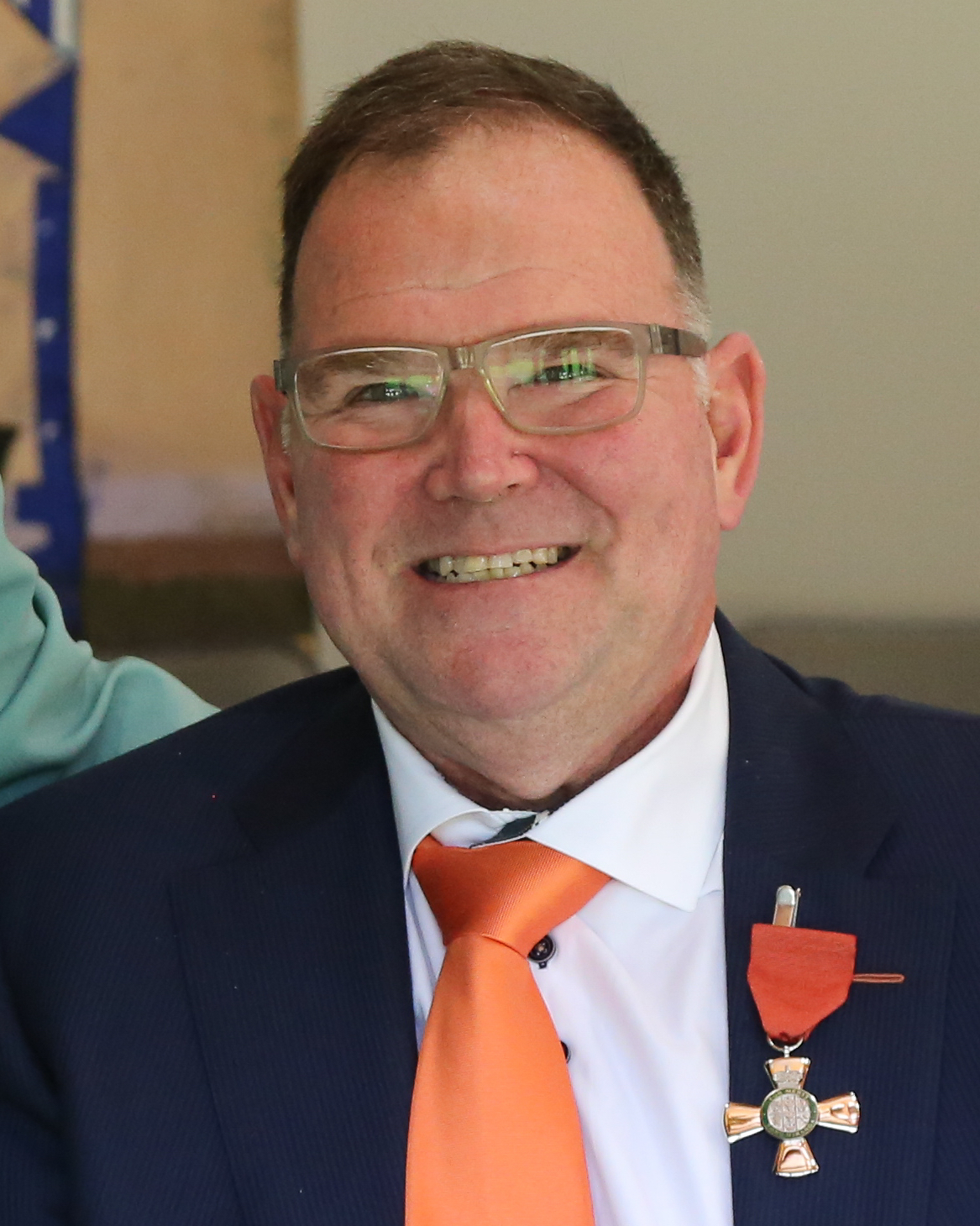
Greg Horton

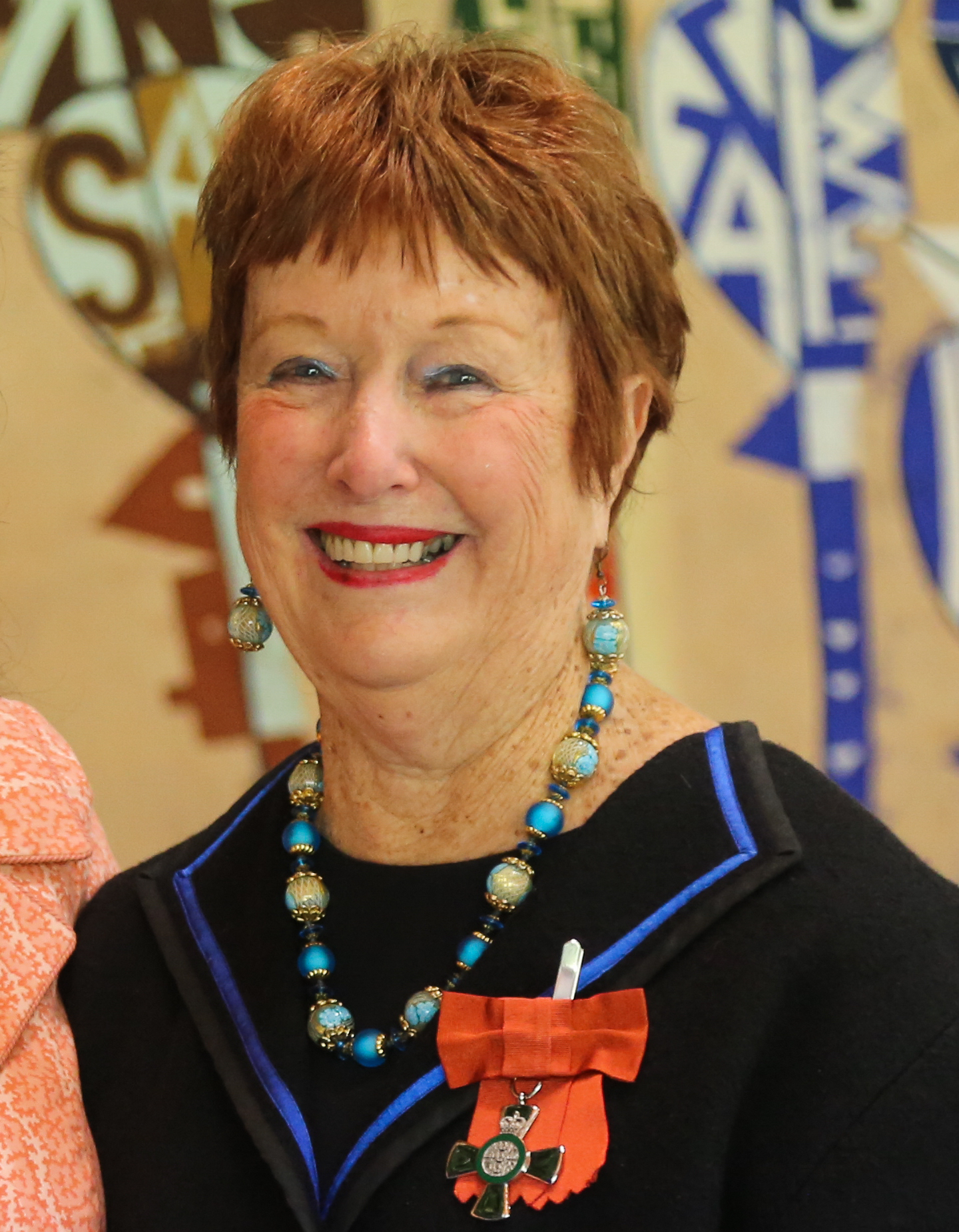
Jo Howse

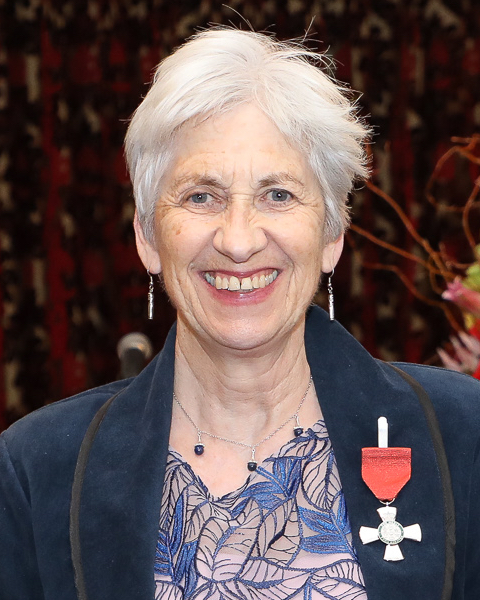
Bev James

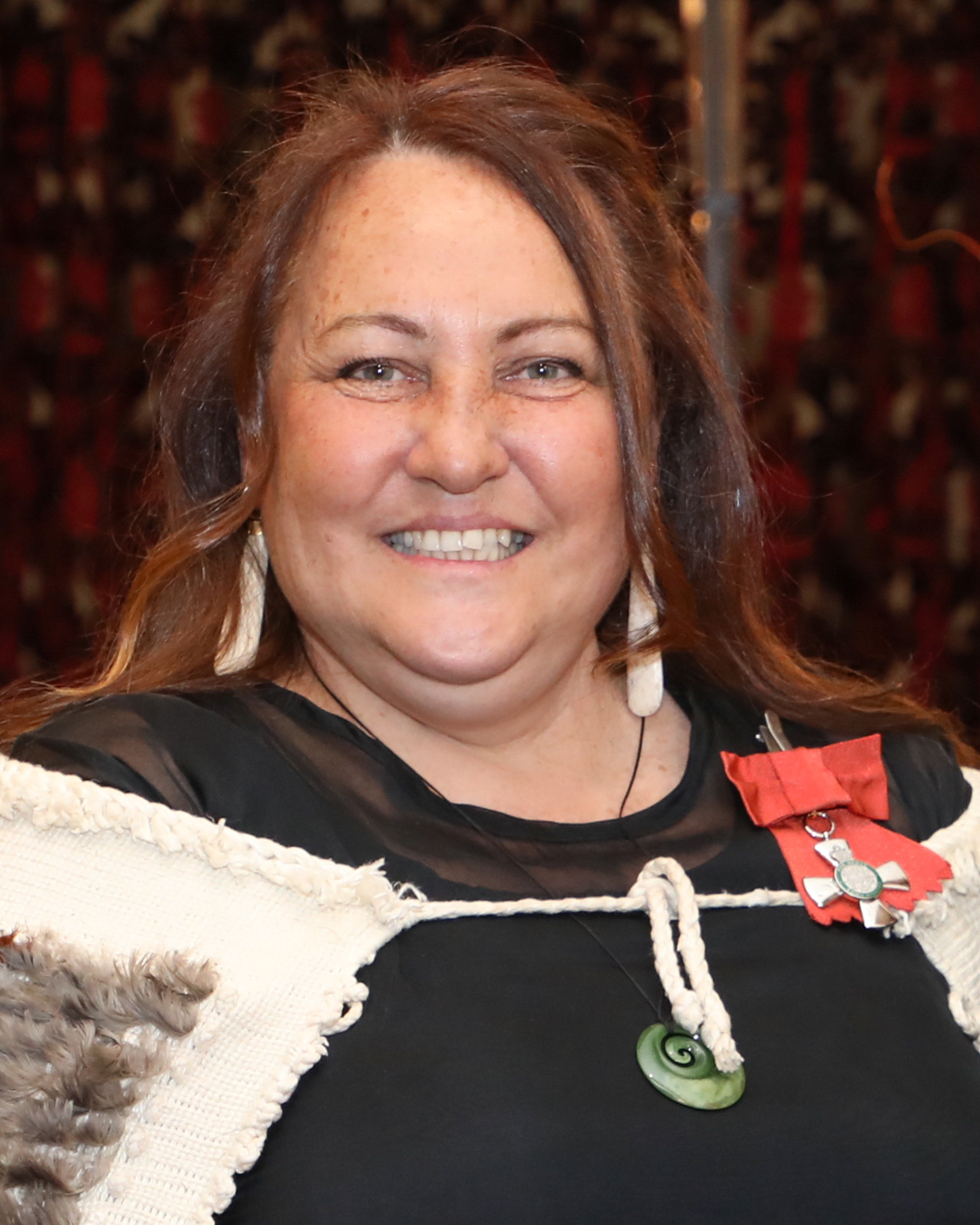
Estelle Leask

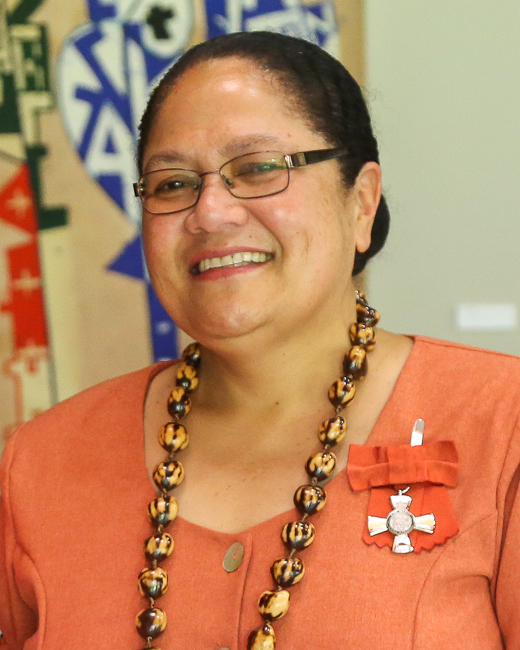
Linita Manu'atu

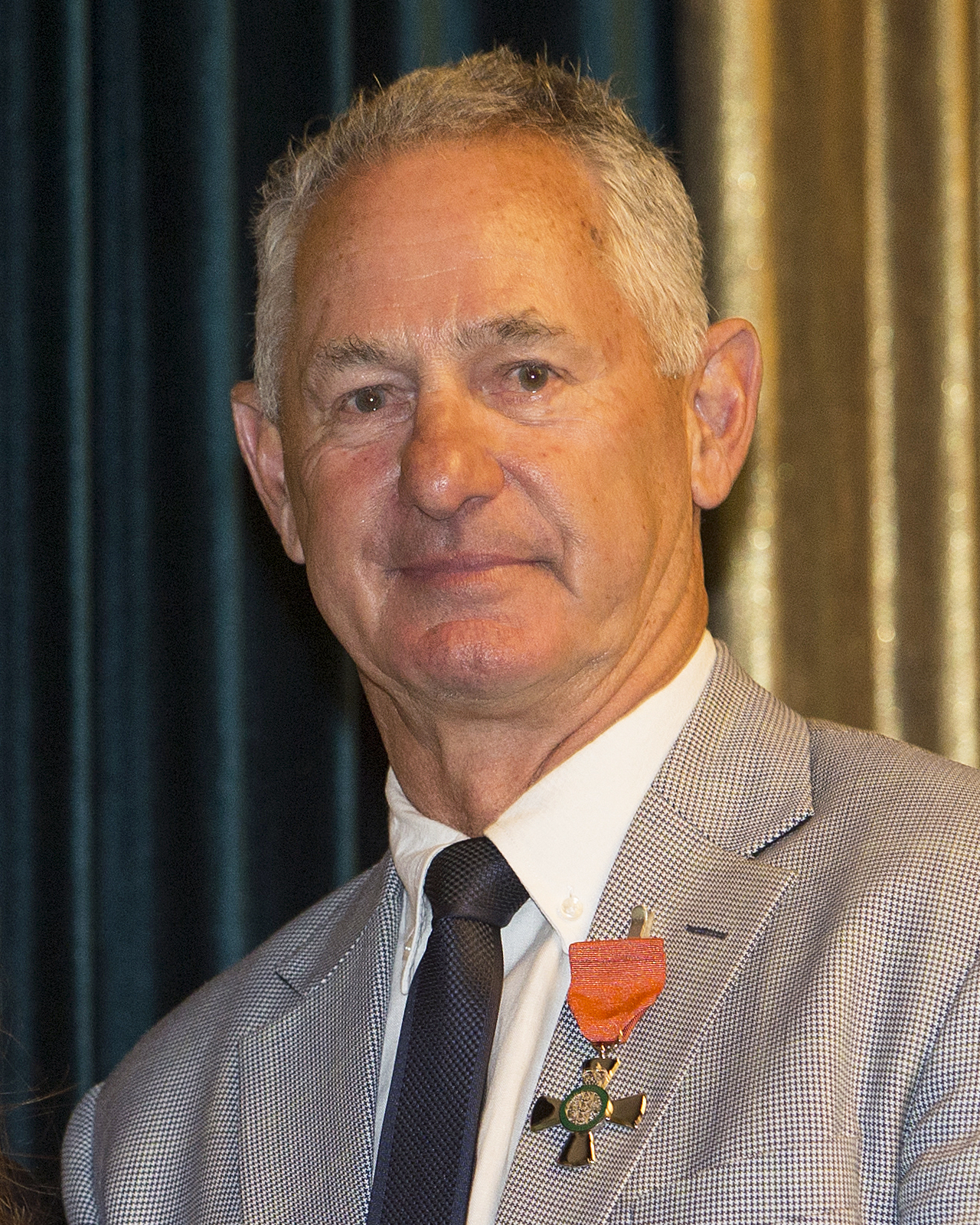
Paul McEwan

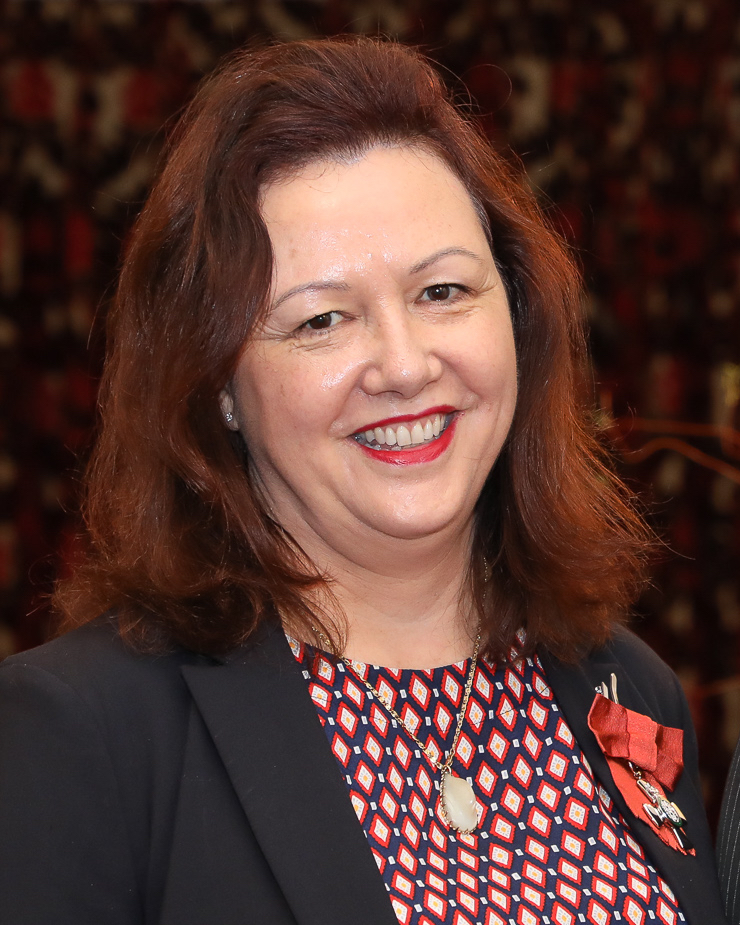
Jasmin McSweeney

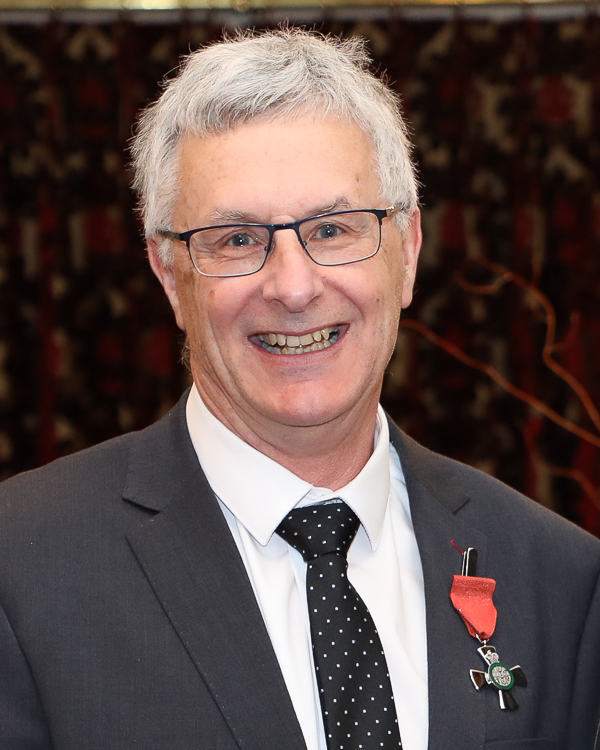
Robert Mills

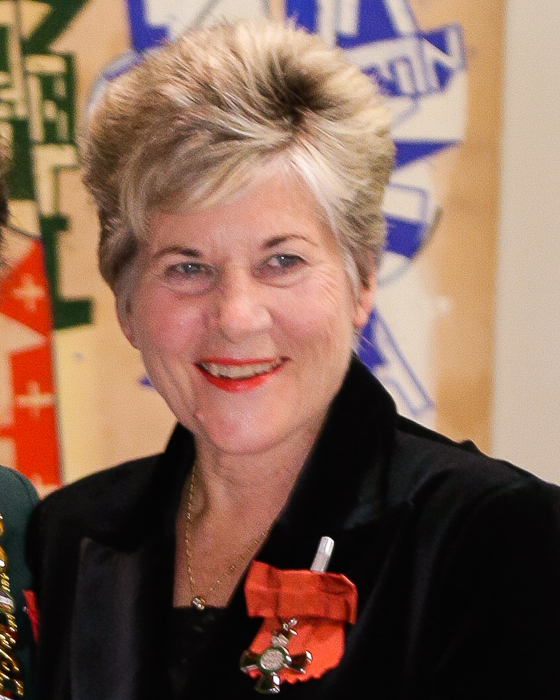
Sharon Morgan

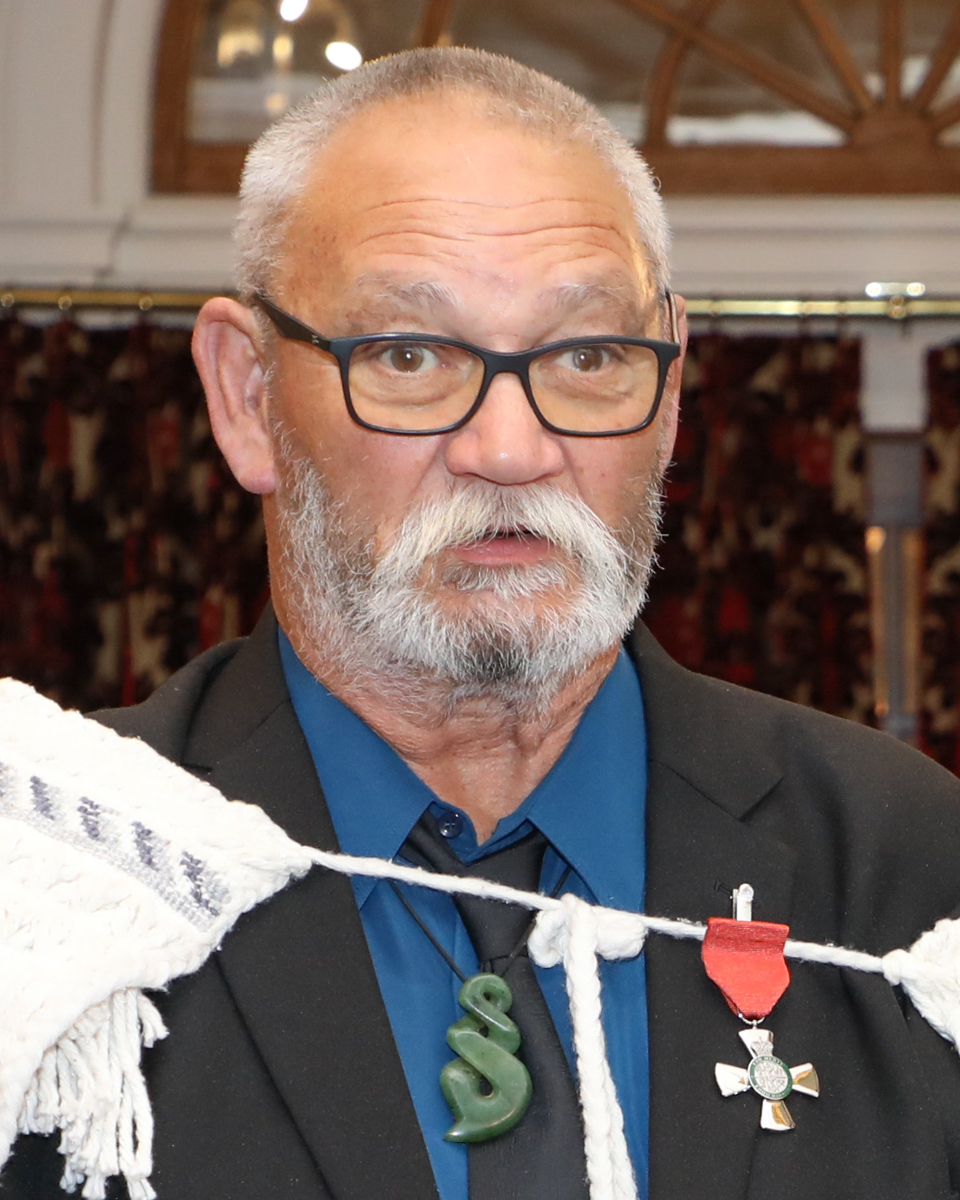
Ngakoma Ngamane

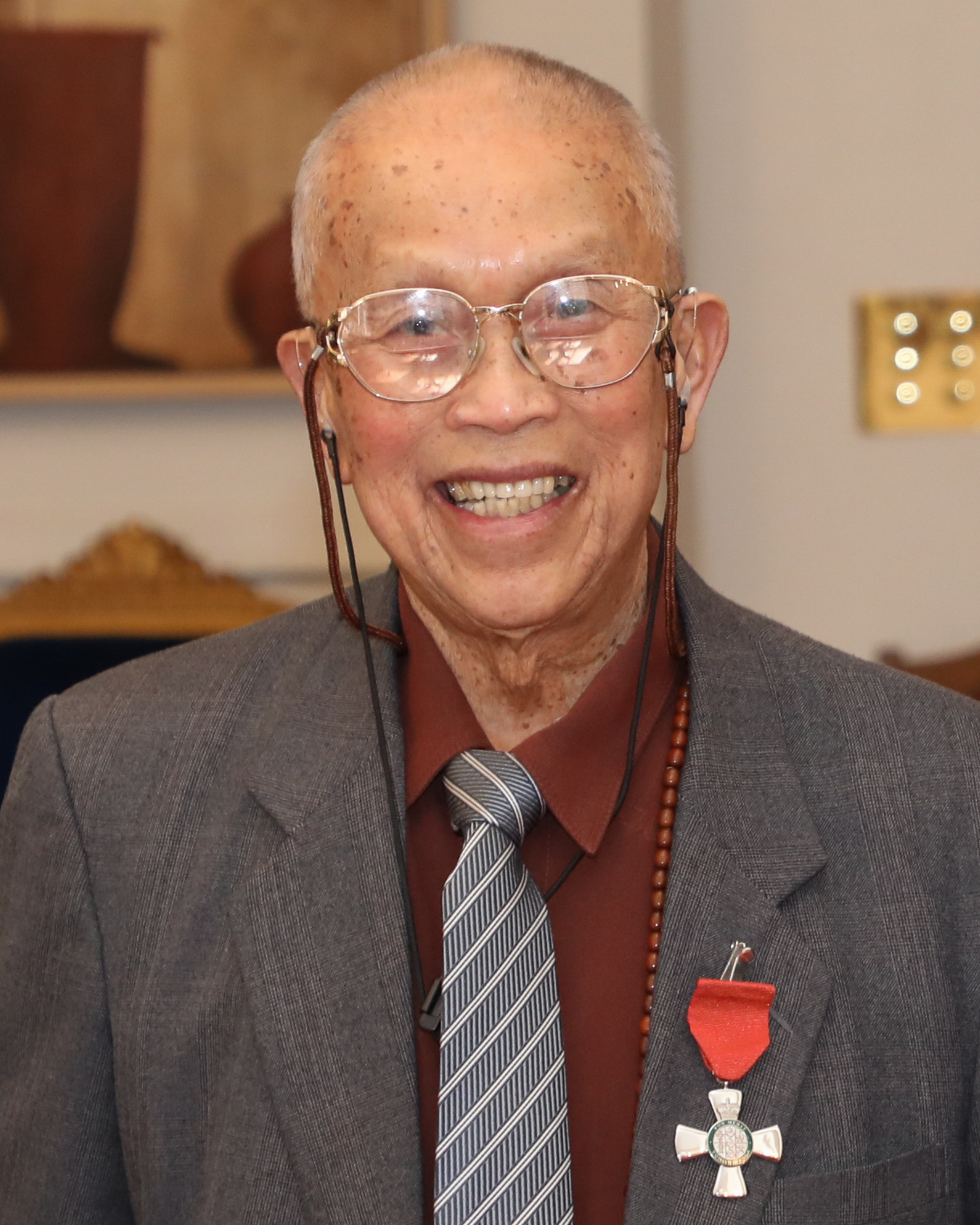
Hai Nguyen

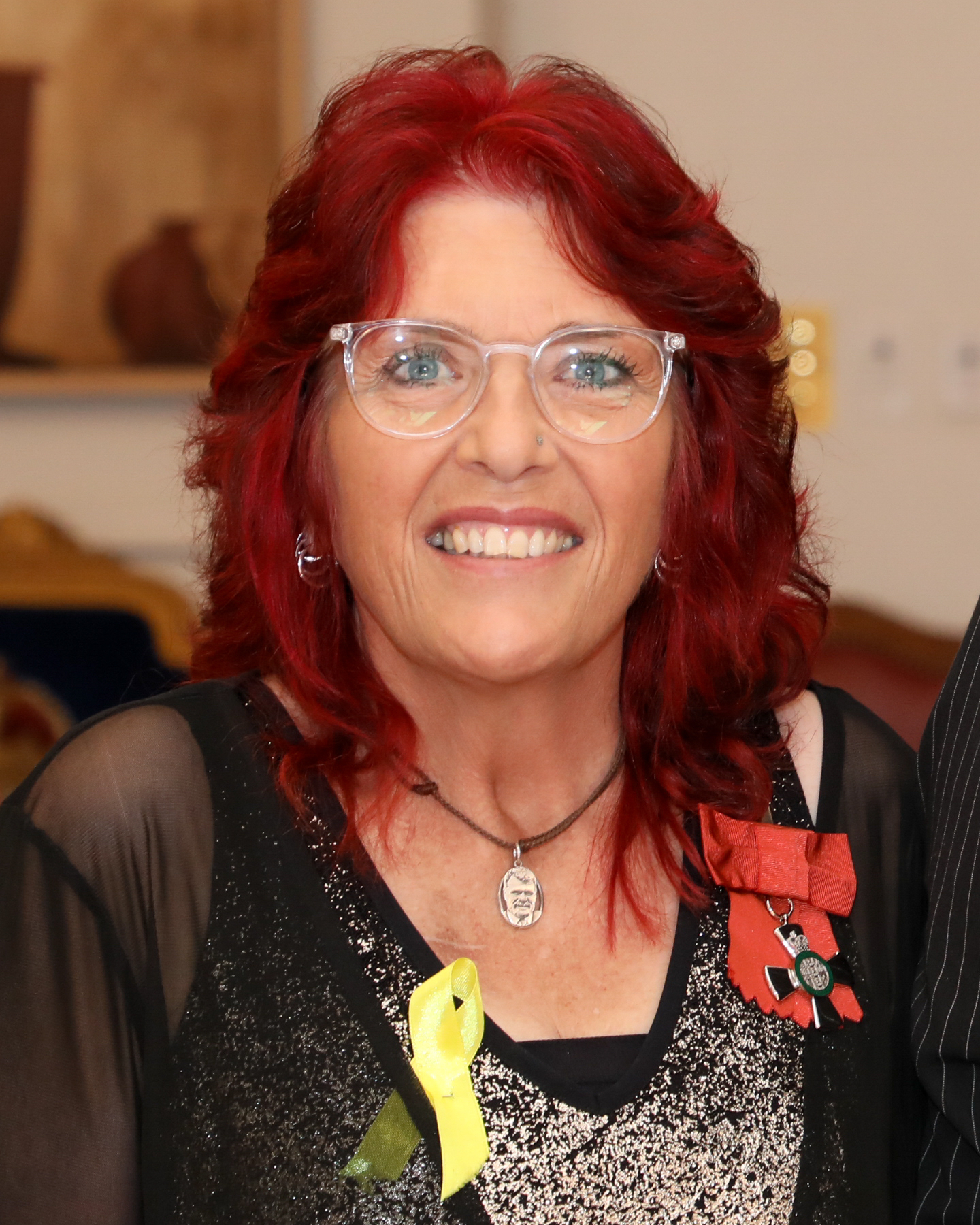
Anna Osborne

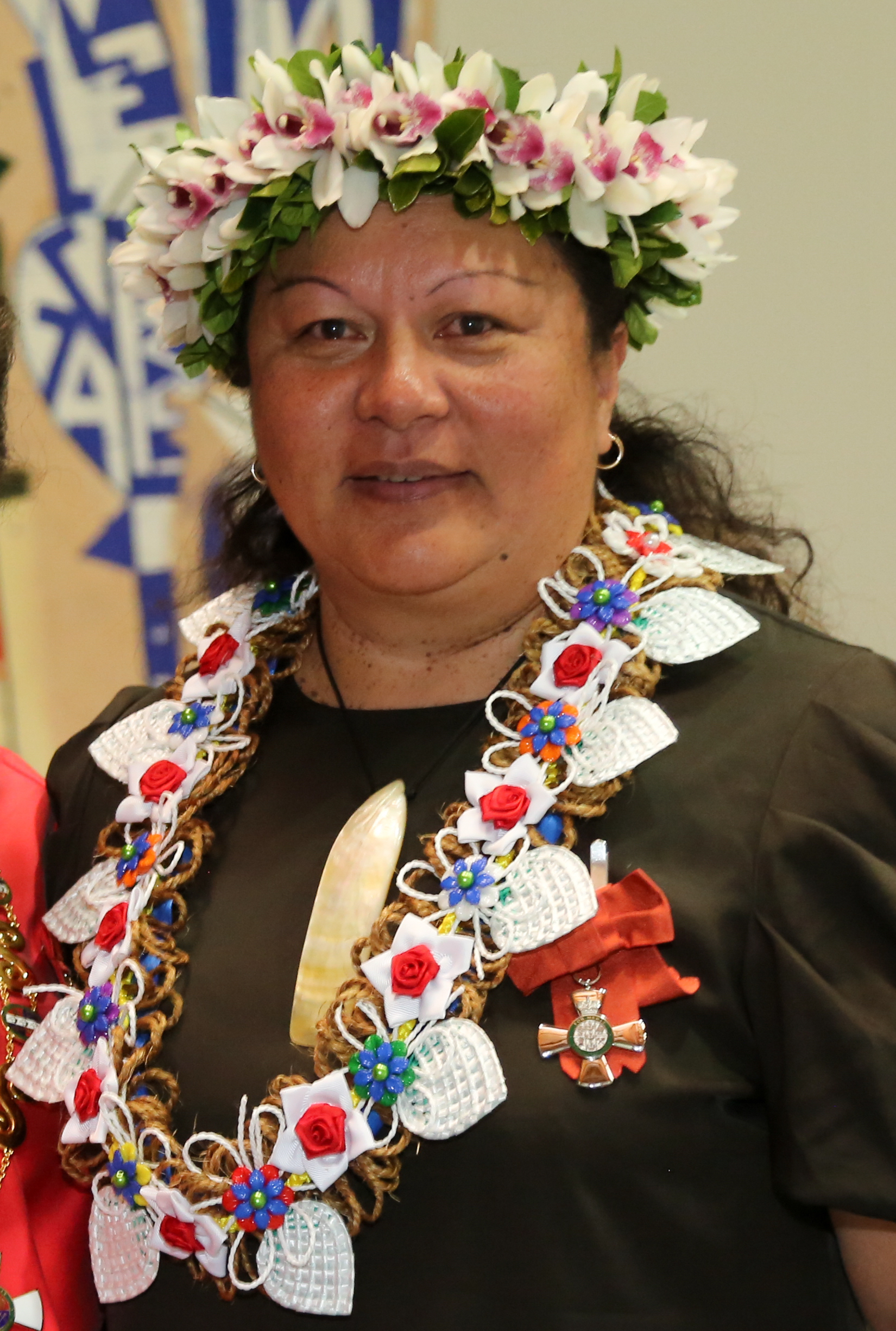
Neta Peau

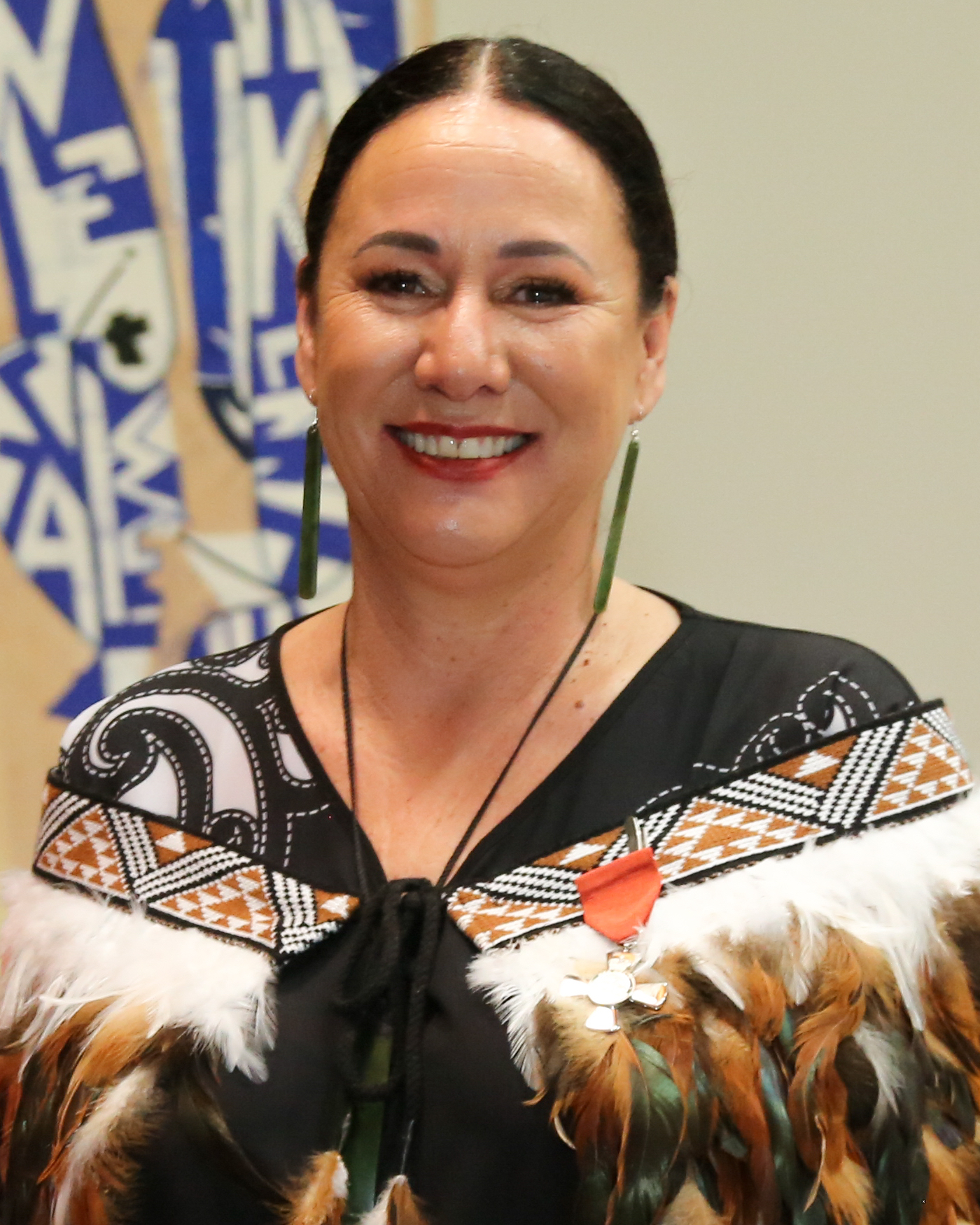
Jo Pilkington

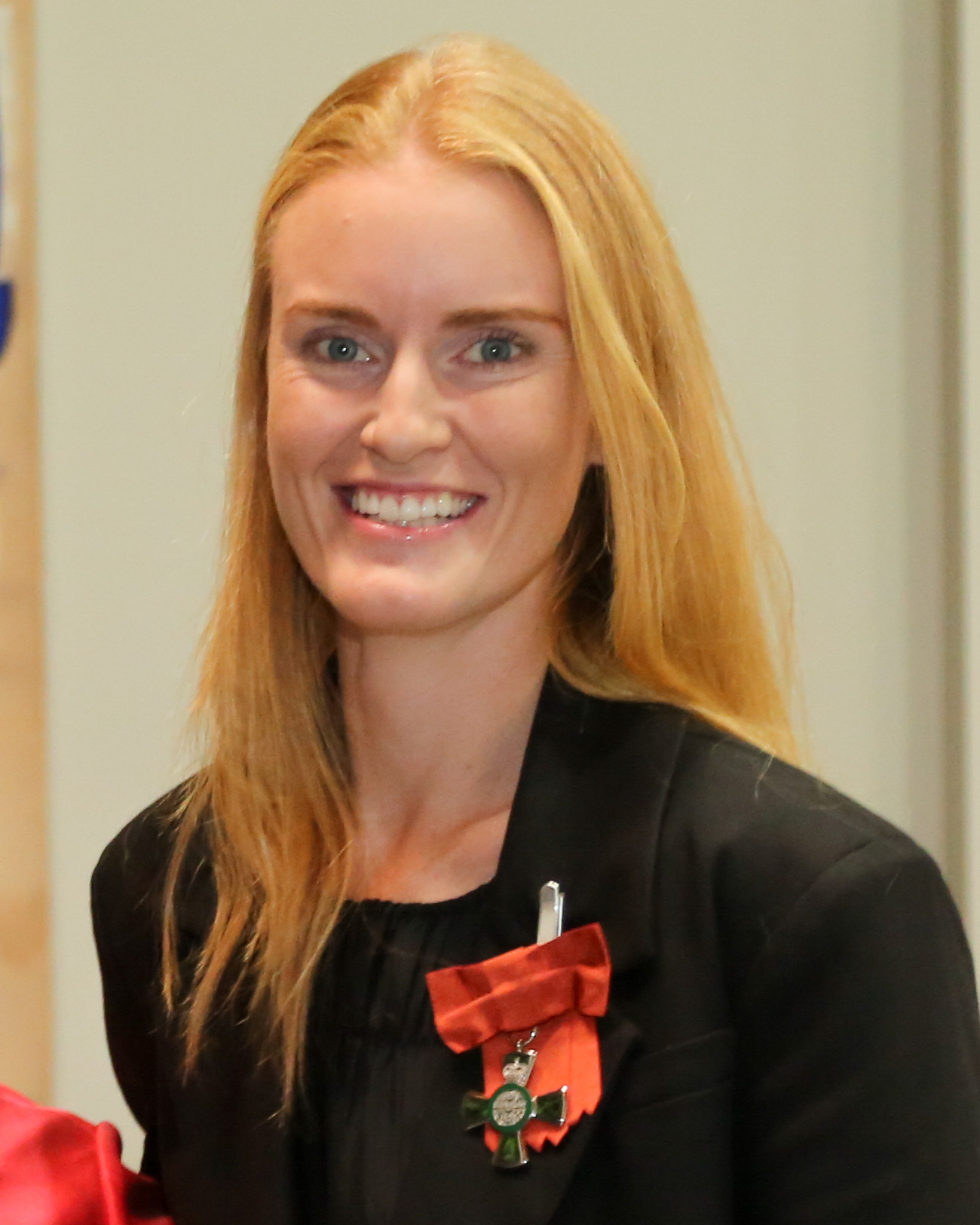
Grace Prendergast

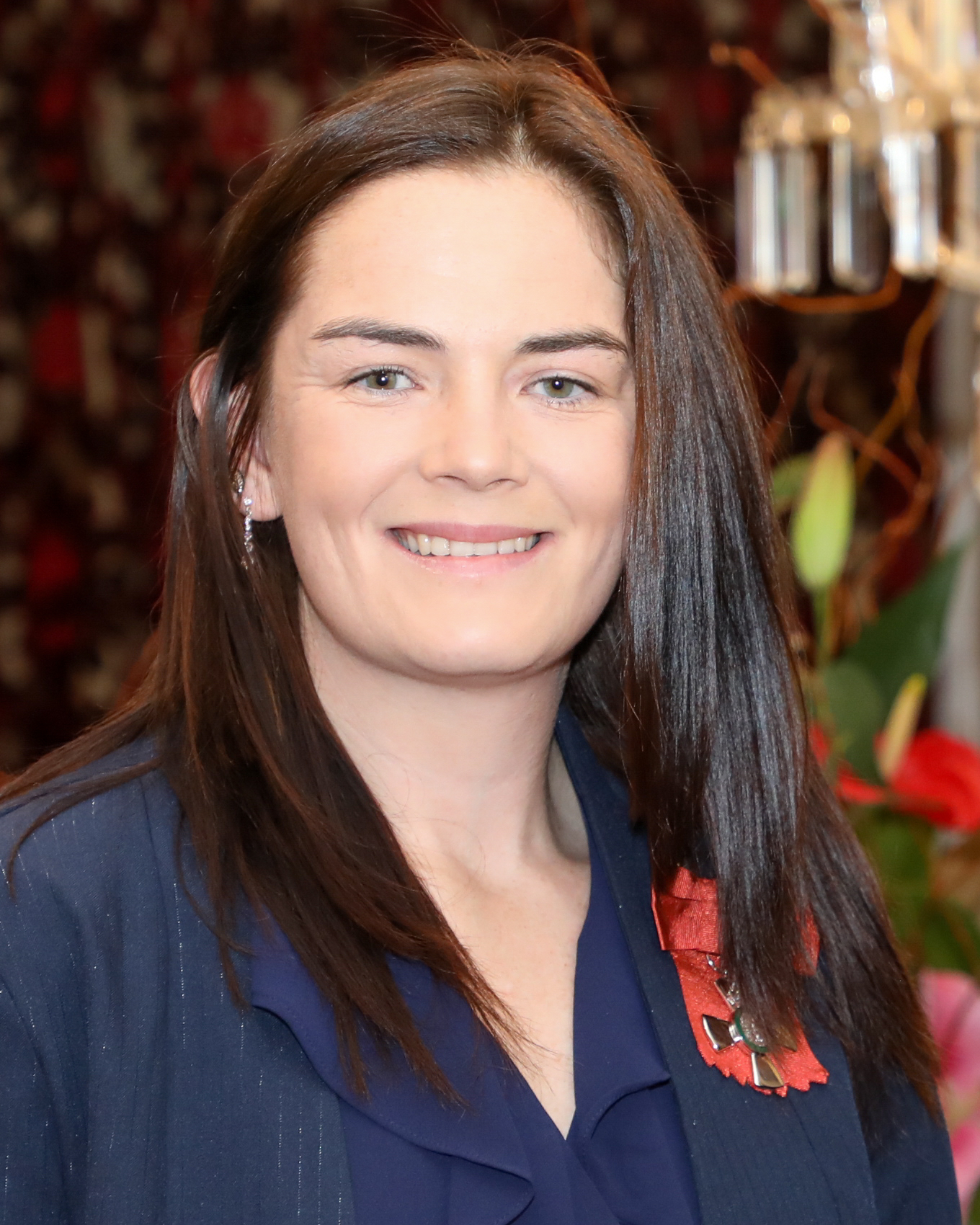
Holly Robinson

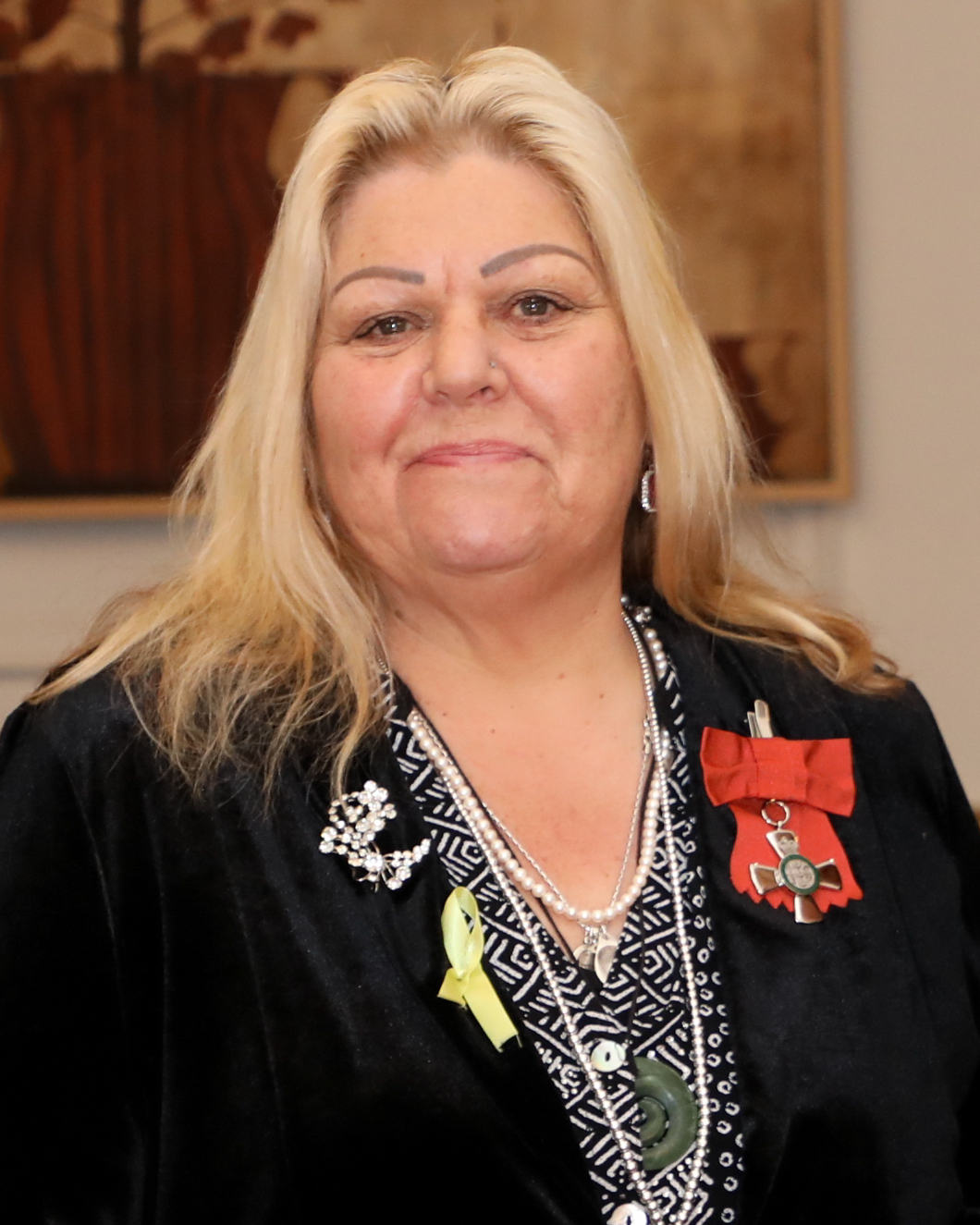
Sonya Rockhouse

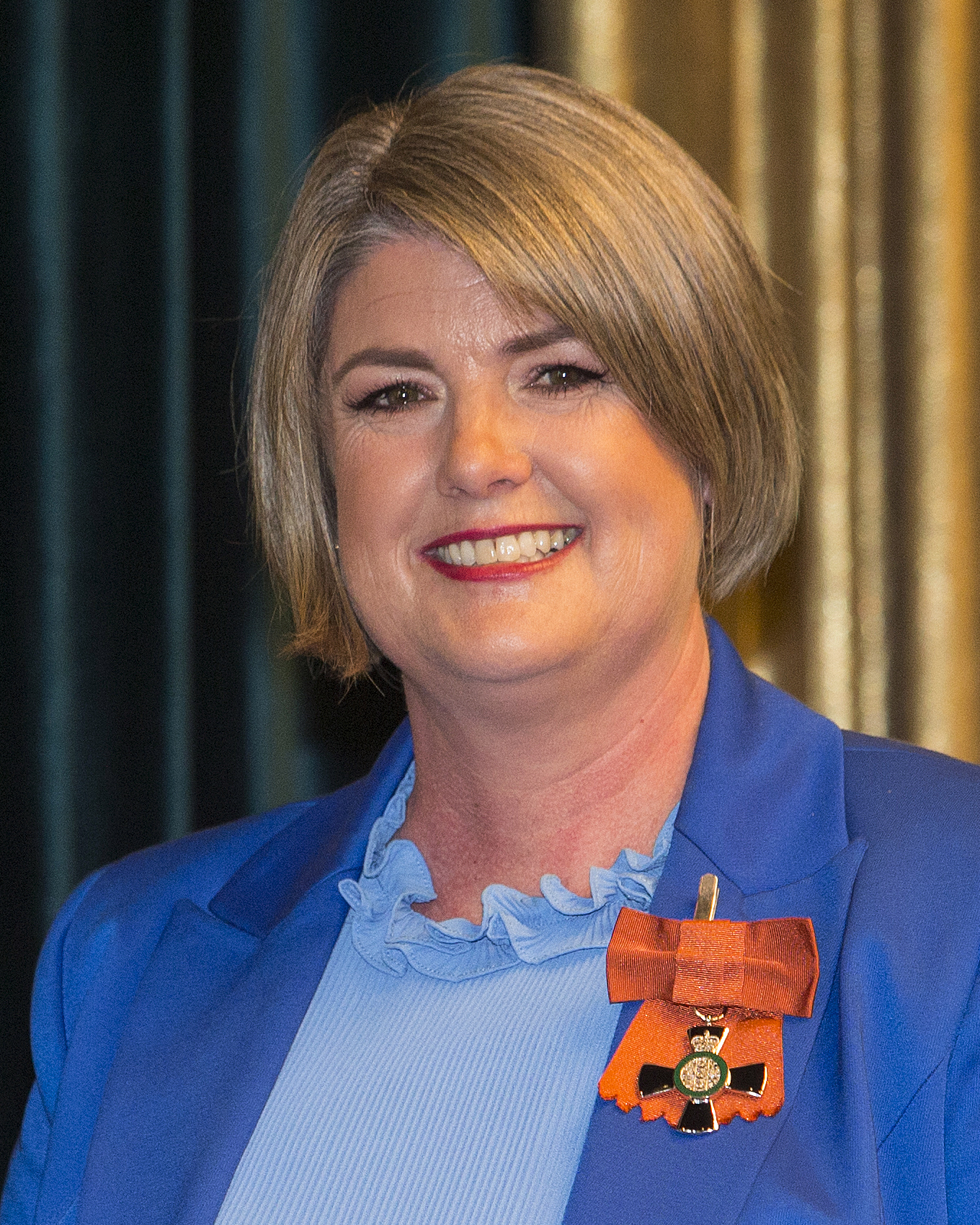
Karla Sanders

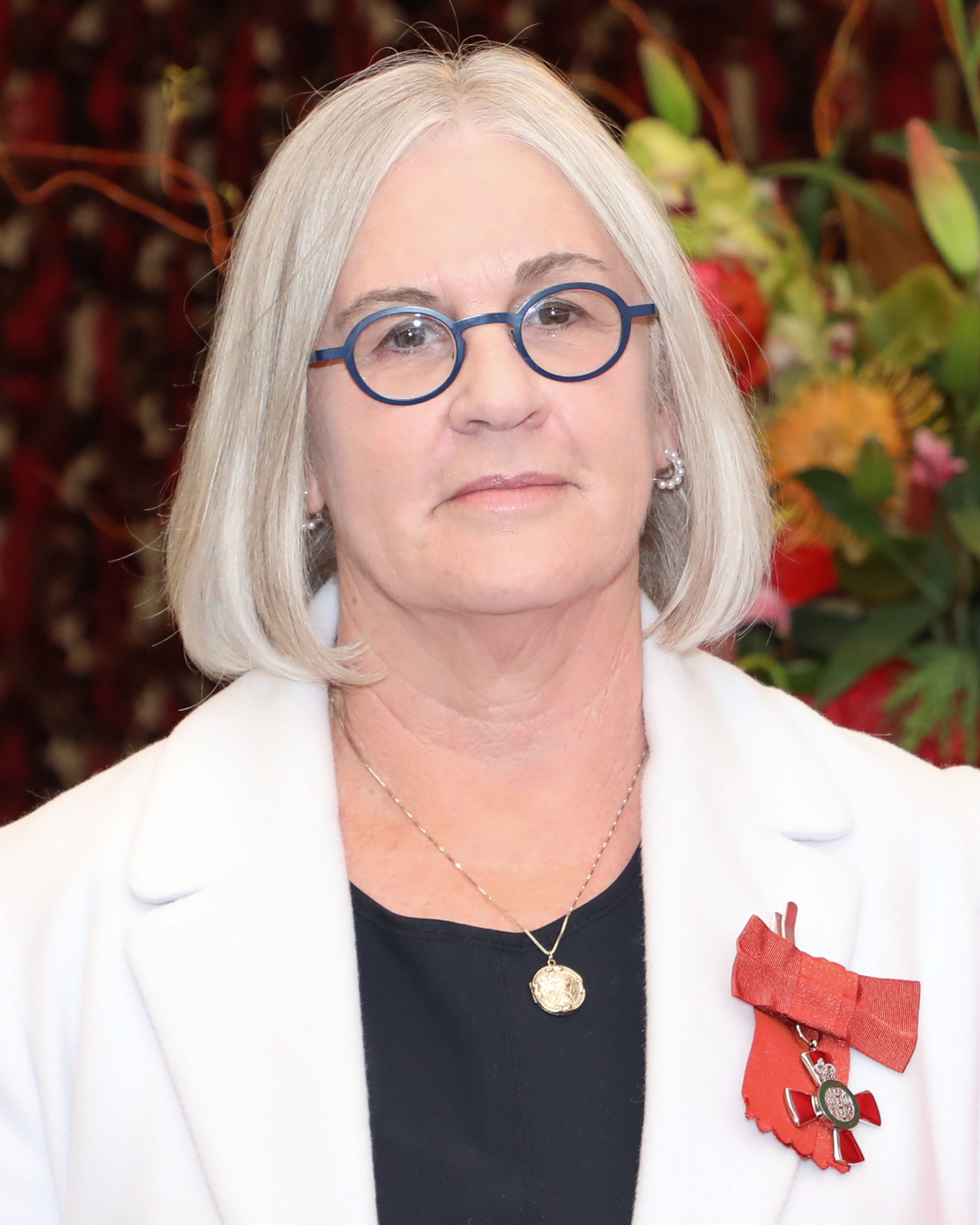
Kim Shannon

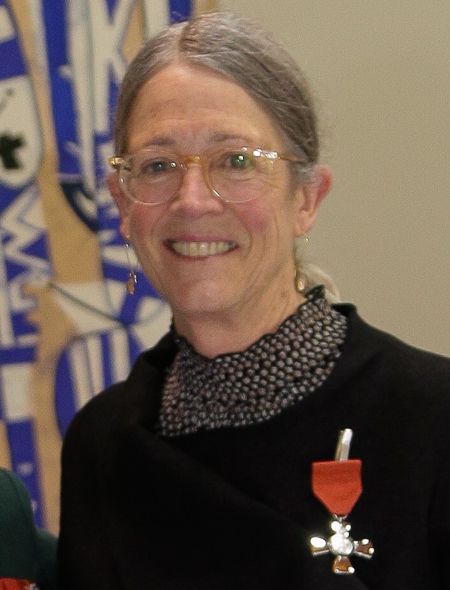
Deidre Shea

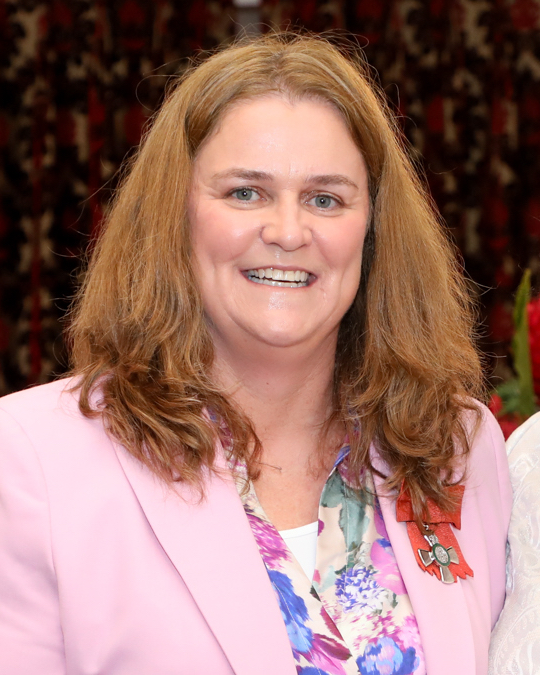
Stacey Shortall

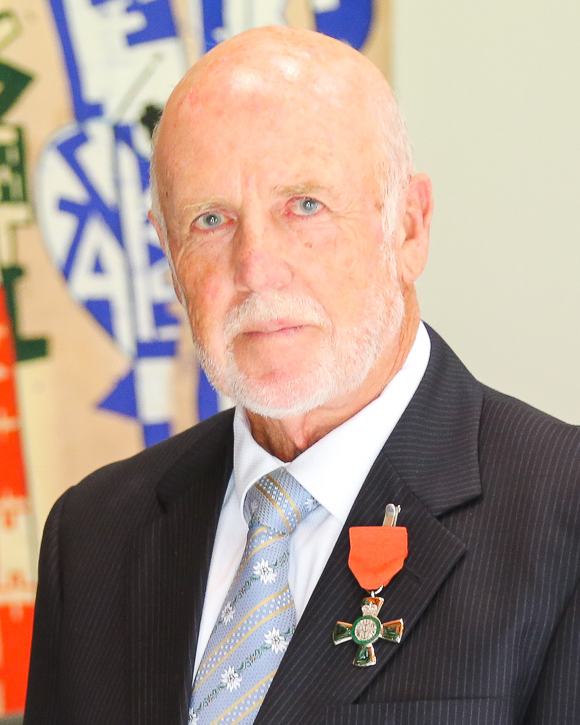
Hugh Stringleman

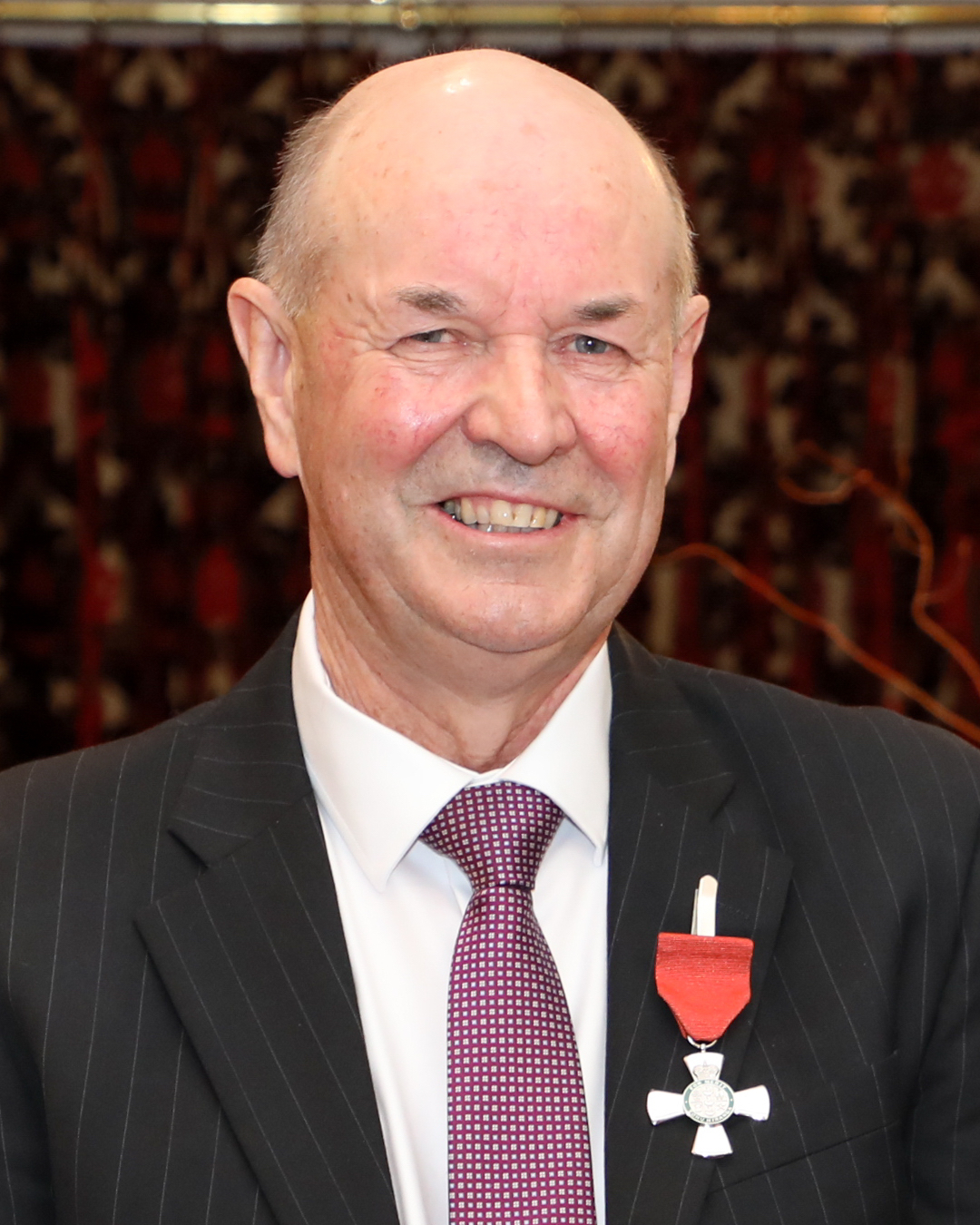
Mark Sutton

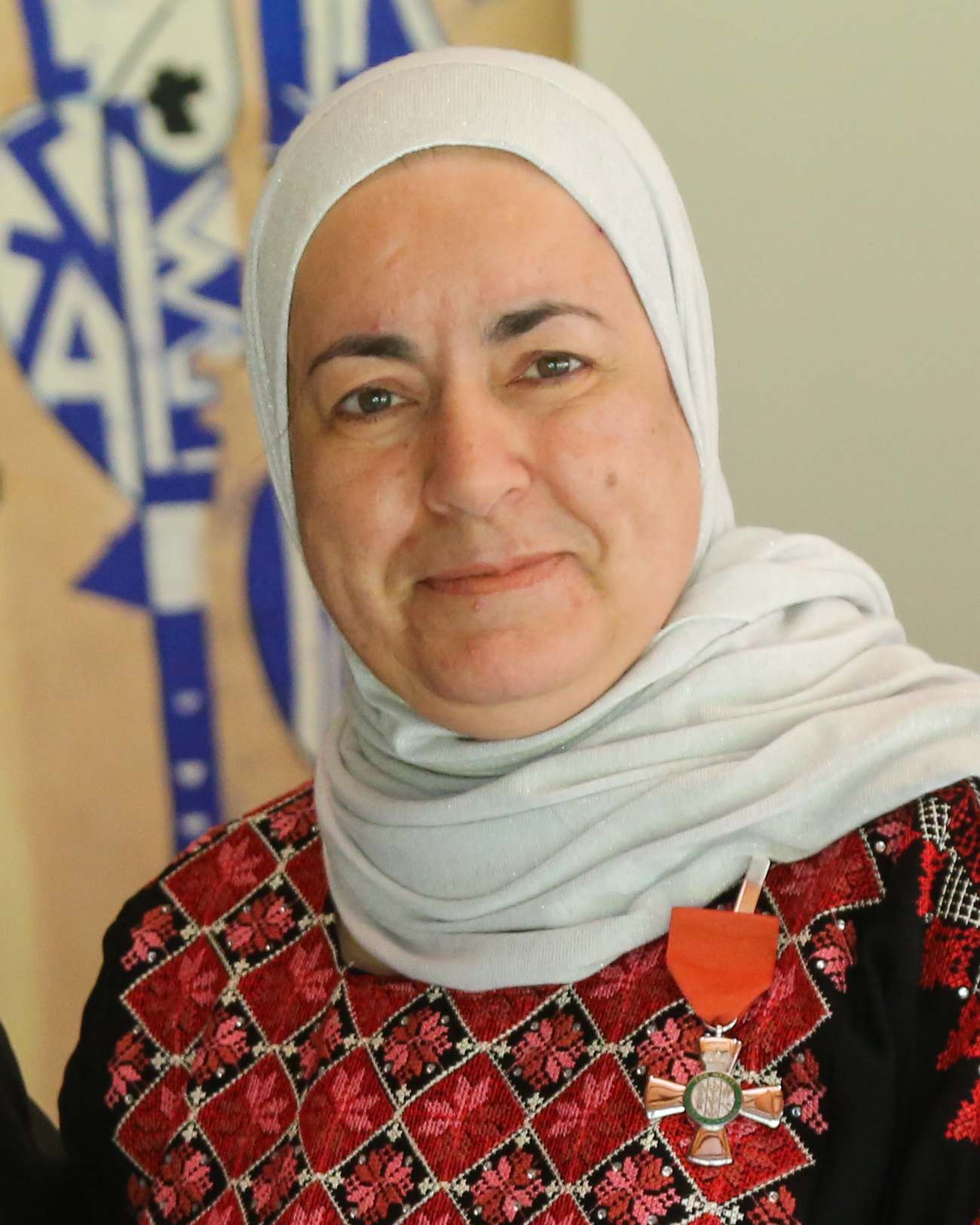
Mai Tamimi

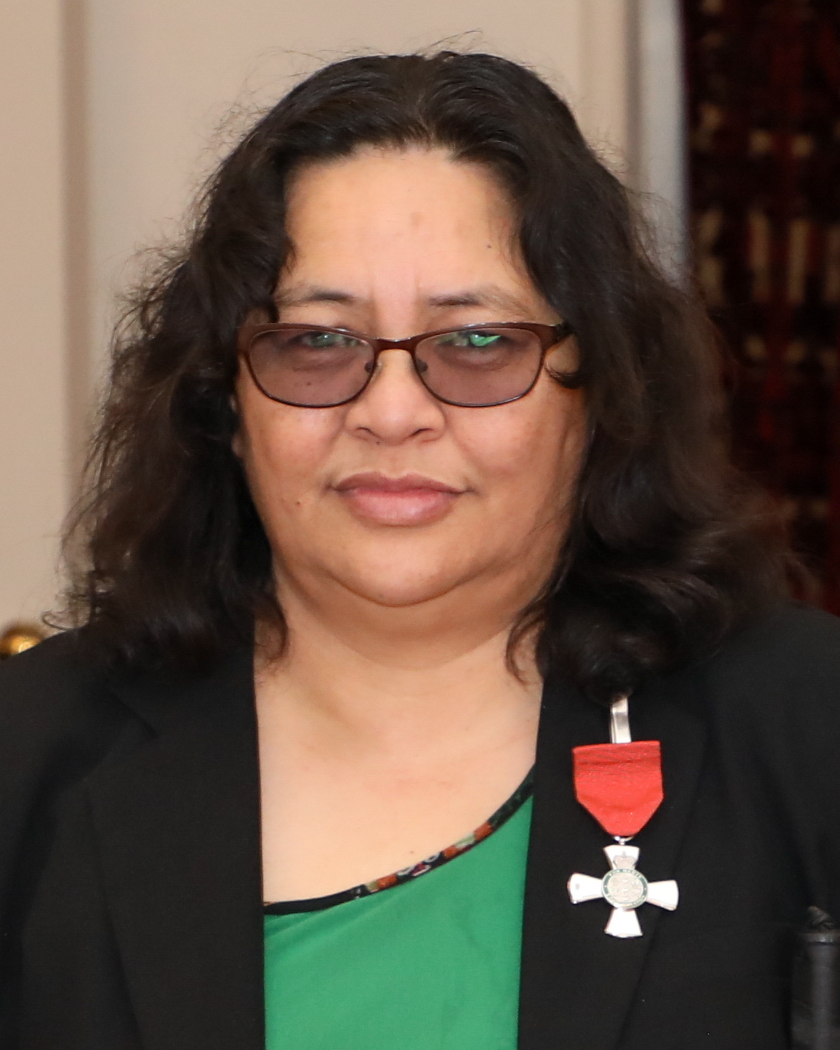
Gaylene Te Rauna

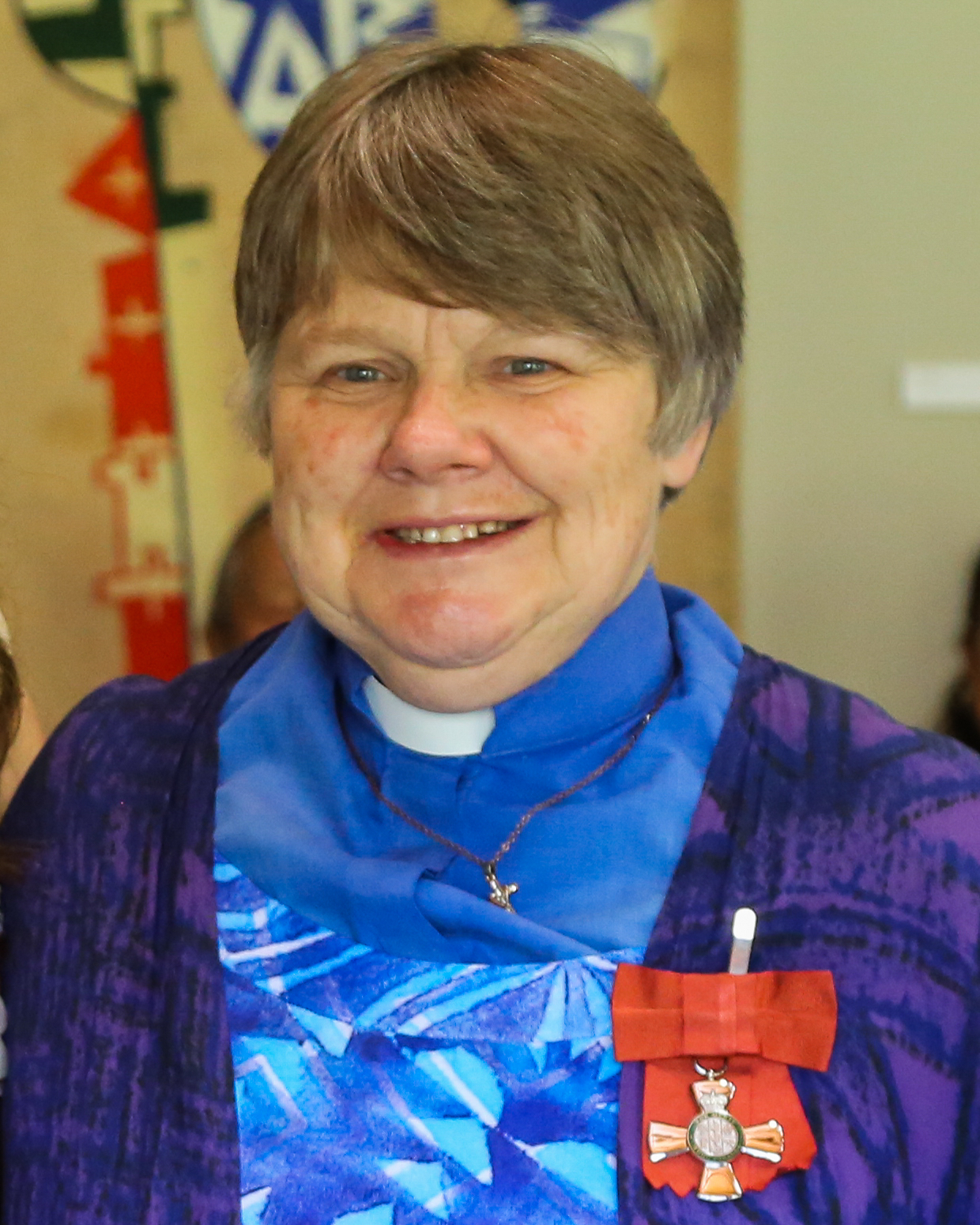
Victoria Terrell

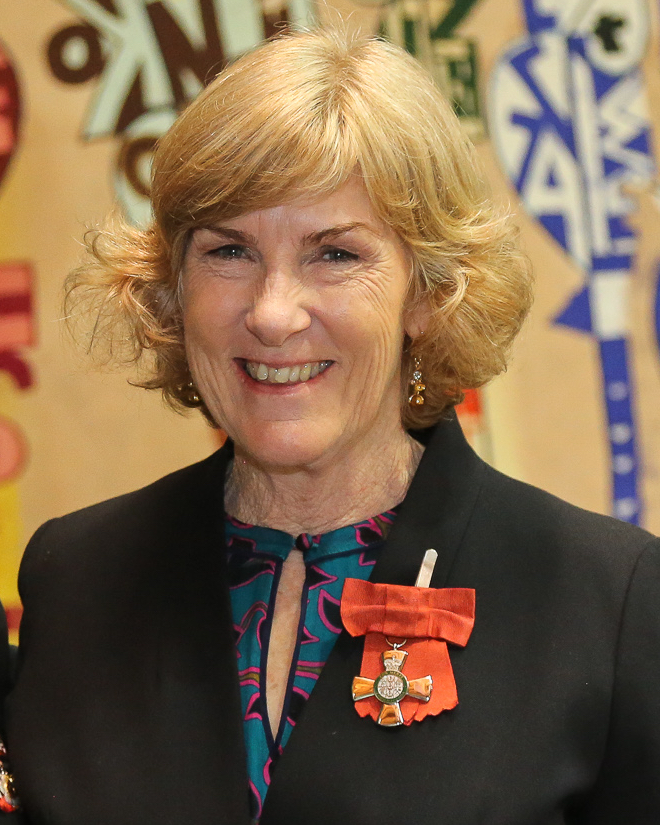
Ann Tod

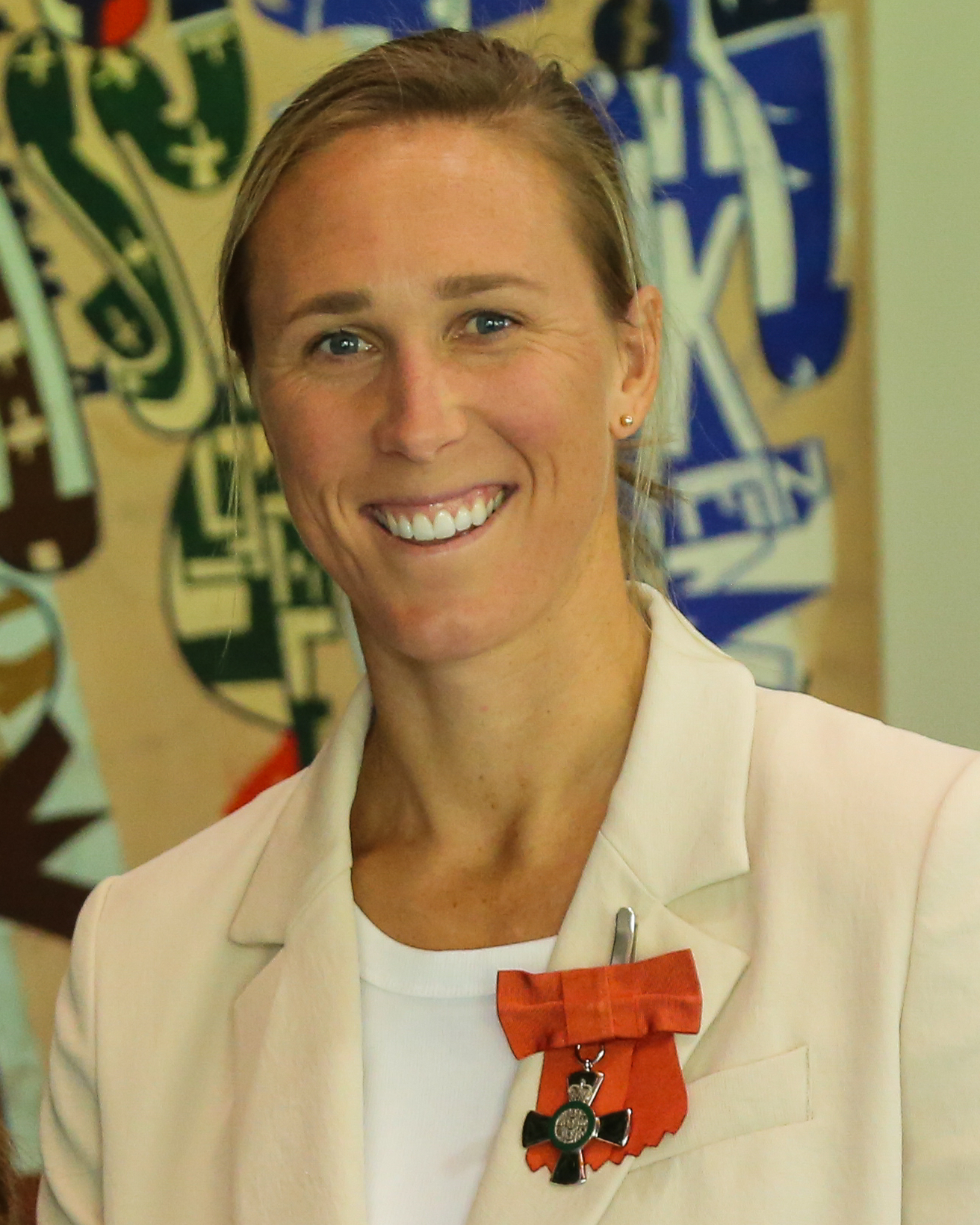
Emma Twigg

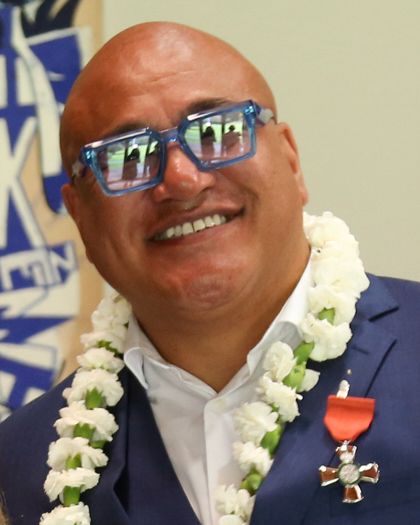
Bill Urale

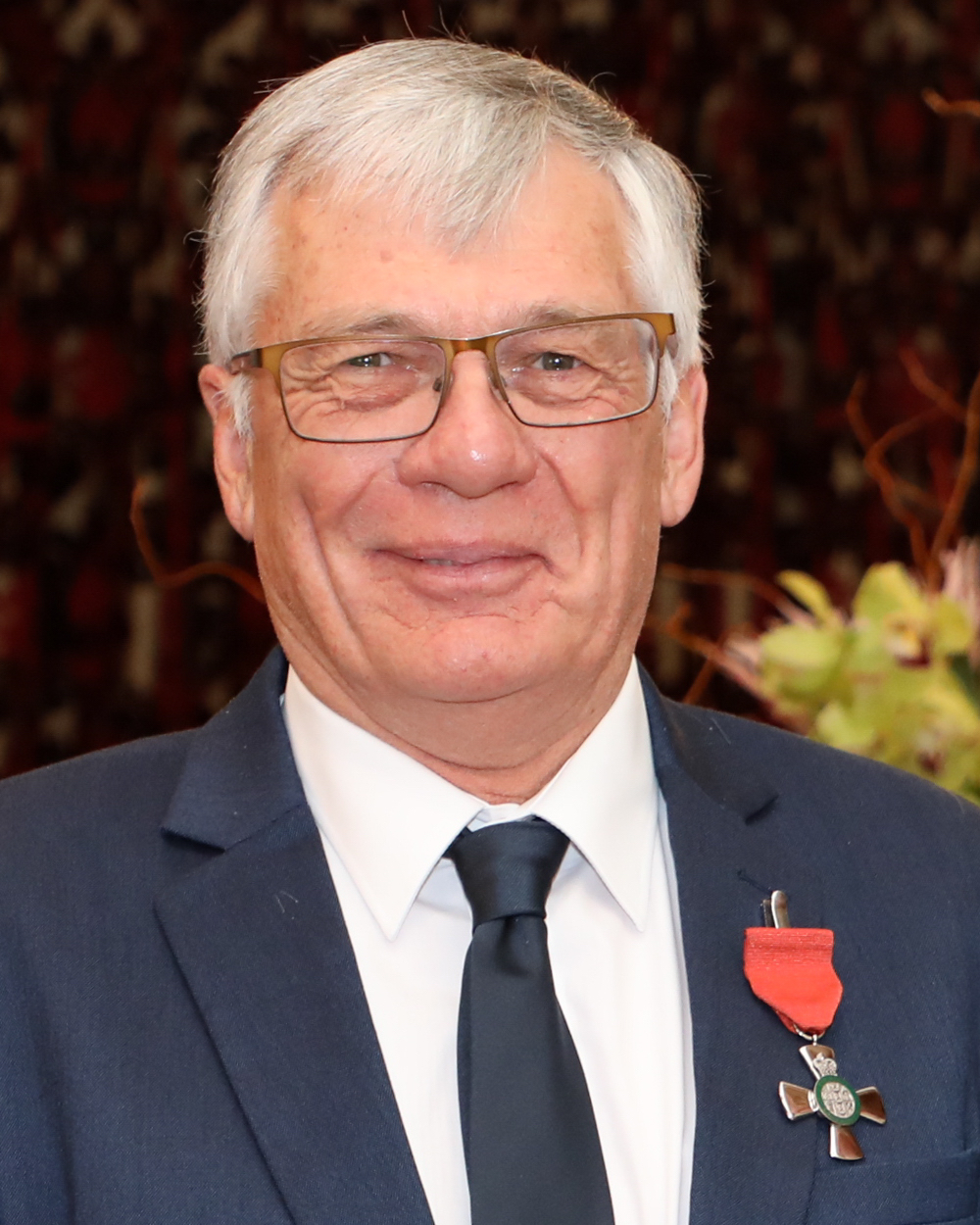
Henry van Tuel

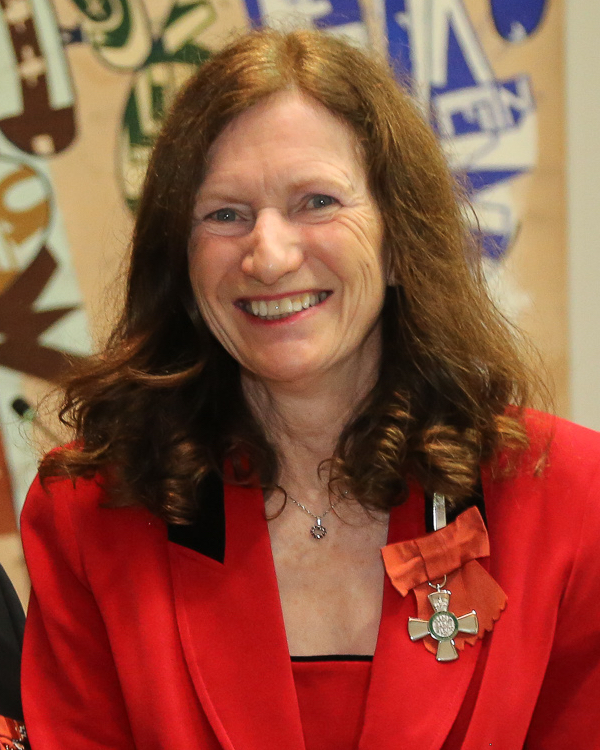
Cynthia Wallbridge

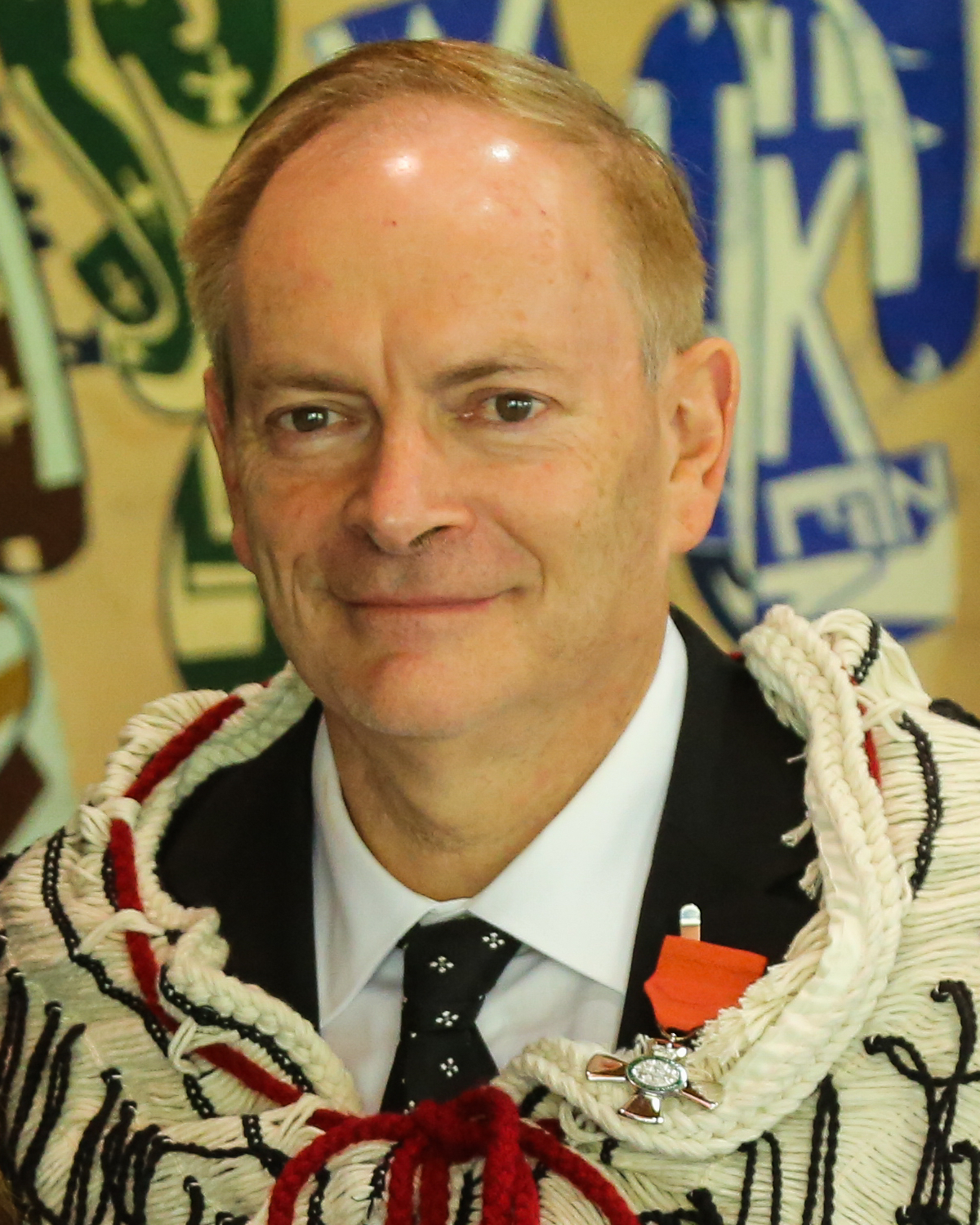
Patrick Walsh

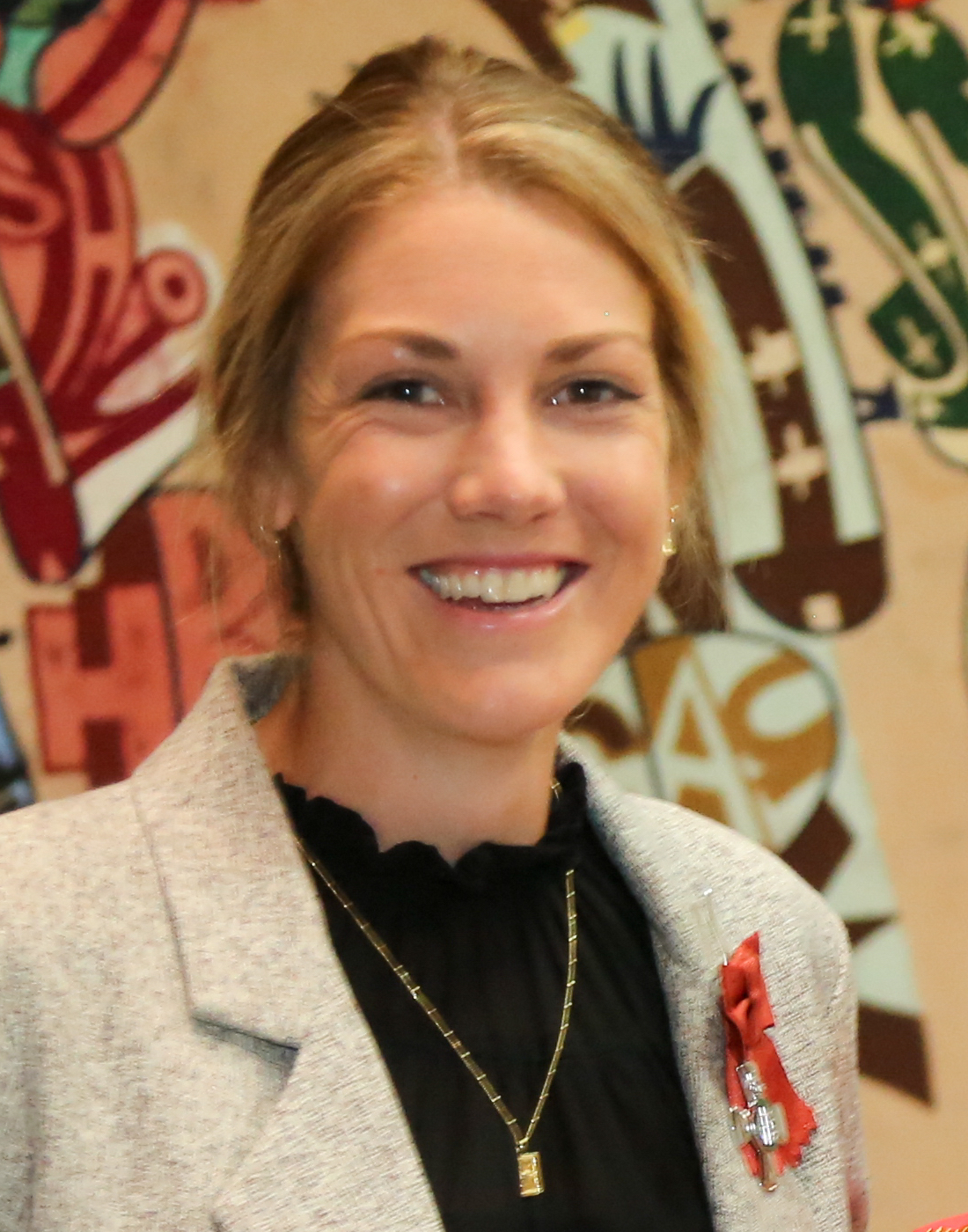
Kerri Williams

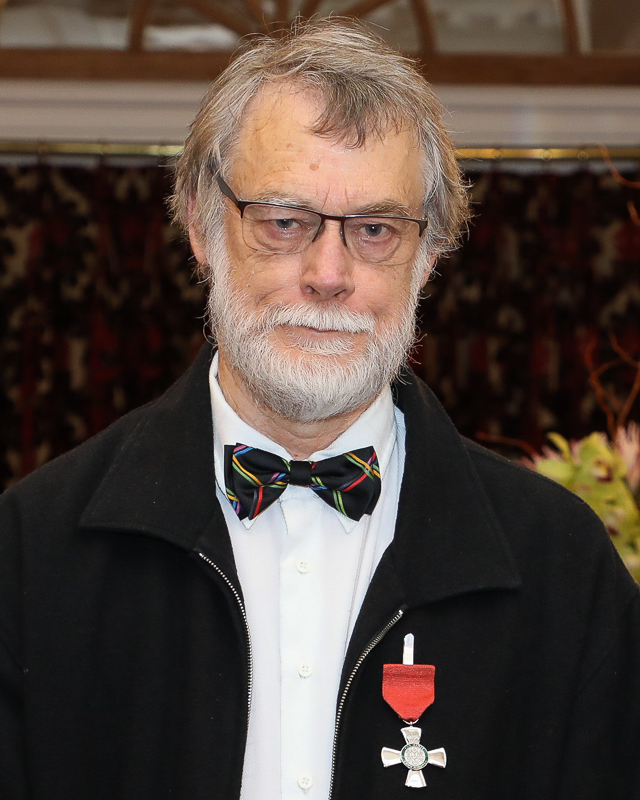
Keith Woodley

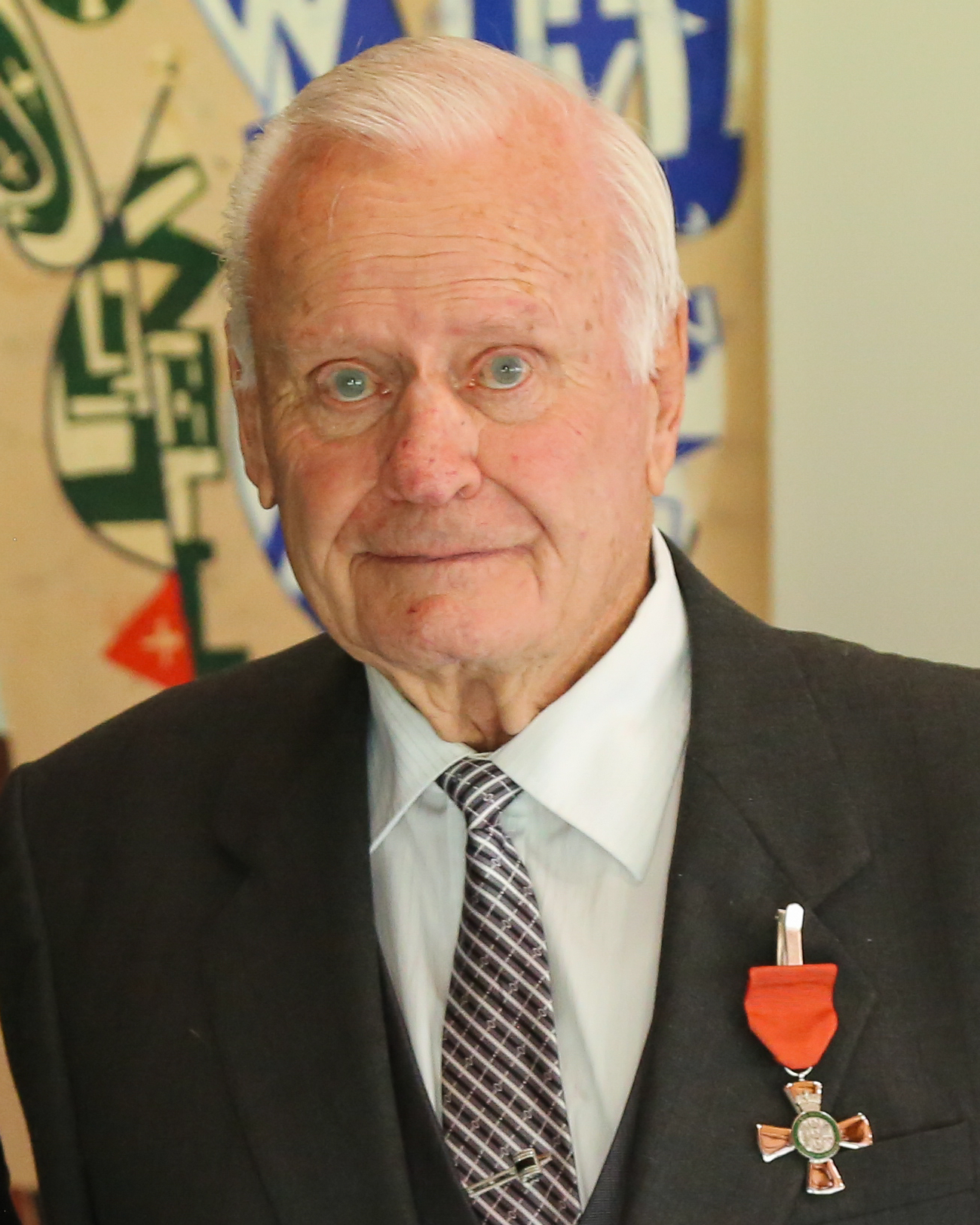
Hans van Ess

== Companion of the Queen's Service Order (QSO) ==
- Fadumo Abdulkadir Ahmed – of Point Chevalier. For services to ethnic communities, women and social entrepreneurship.
- Judge Andrew John Becroft – of Karori. For services to the judiciary, children and youth.
- Naomi Patricia Ferguson – of Paraparaumu. For services to the public service.
- Reverend Jonathan Peter Hartley – of Oriental Bay. For services to governance and the community.
- Simon James Manning JP – of Paraparaumu Beach. For services to funeral services and disaster victim identification.
- Cheryll Bronwyn Martin – of Birkdale. For services to the community.
- Dr Leslie Francis Molloy – of Point Howard. For services to conservation and outdoor recreation.
- Julie Read – of Devonport. For services to the State.
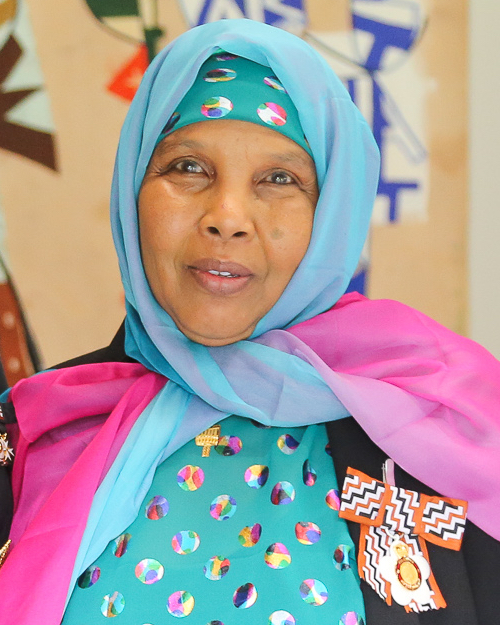
Fadumo Ahmed

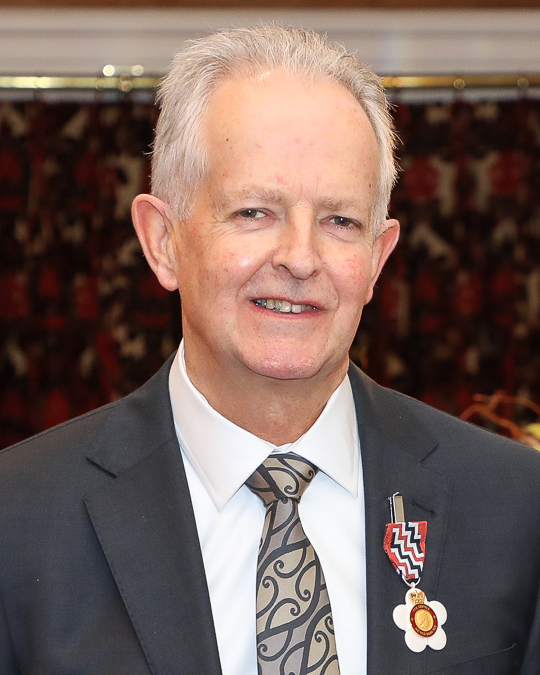
Andrew Becroft

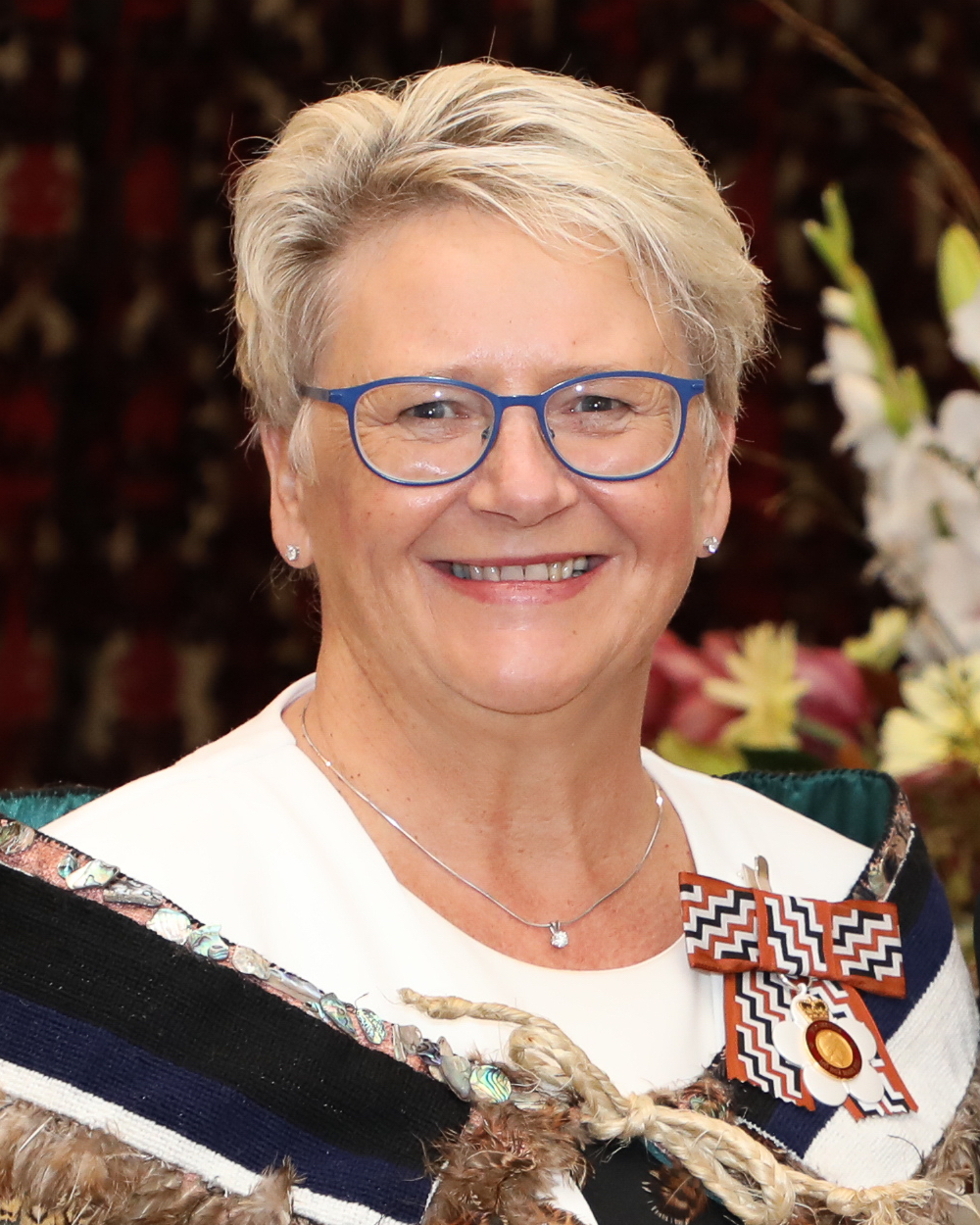
Naomi Ferguson

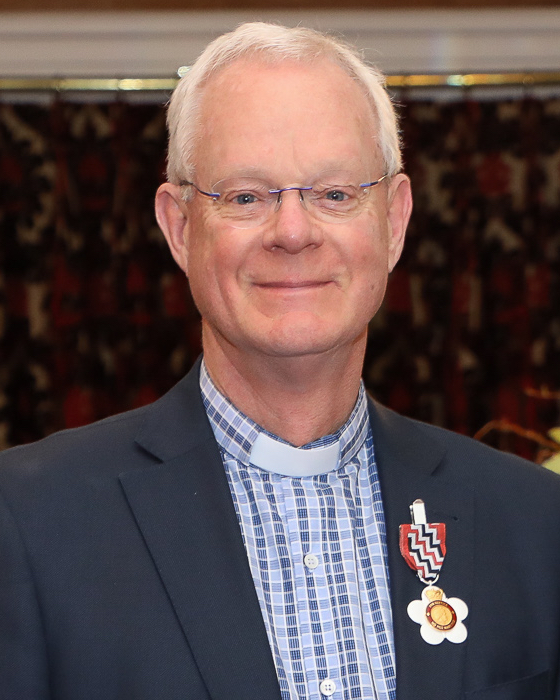
Jon Hartley

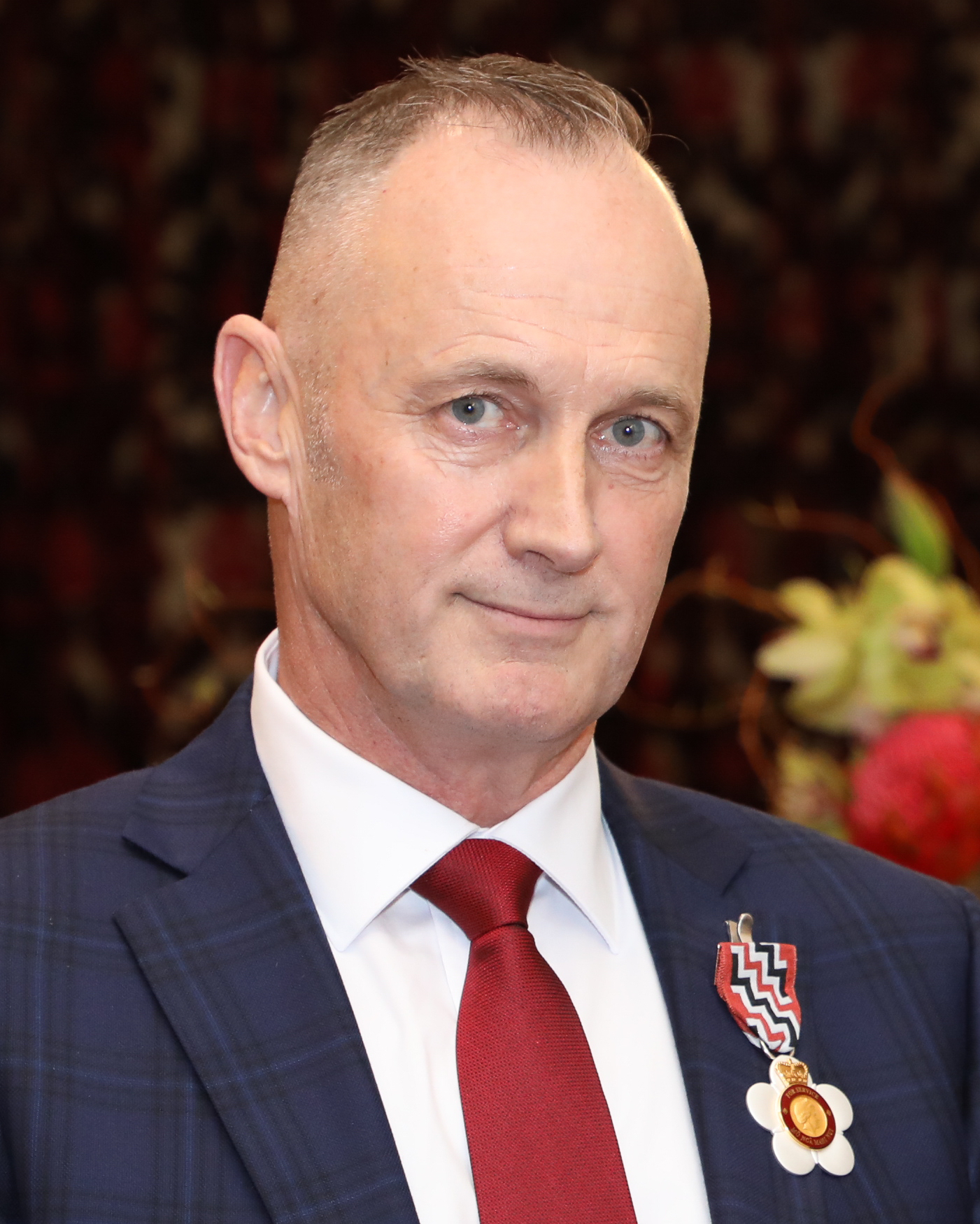
Simon Manning

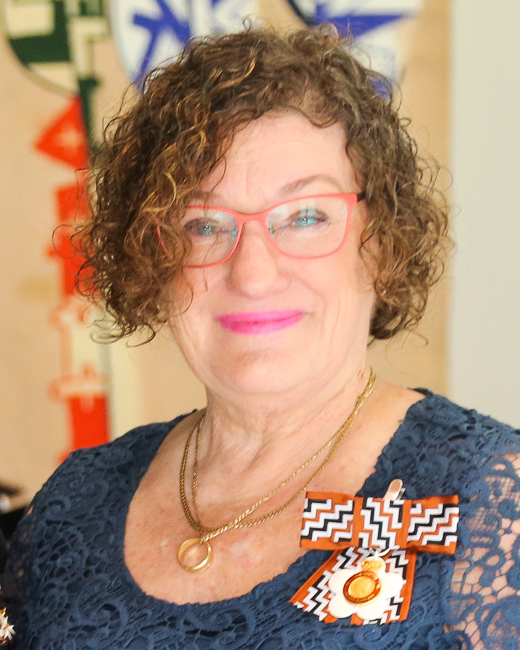
Cheryll Martin

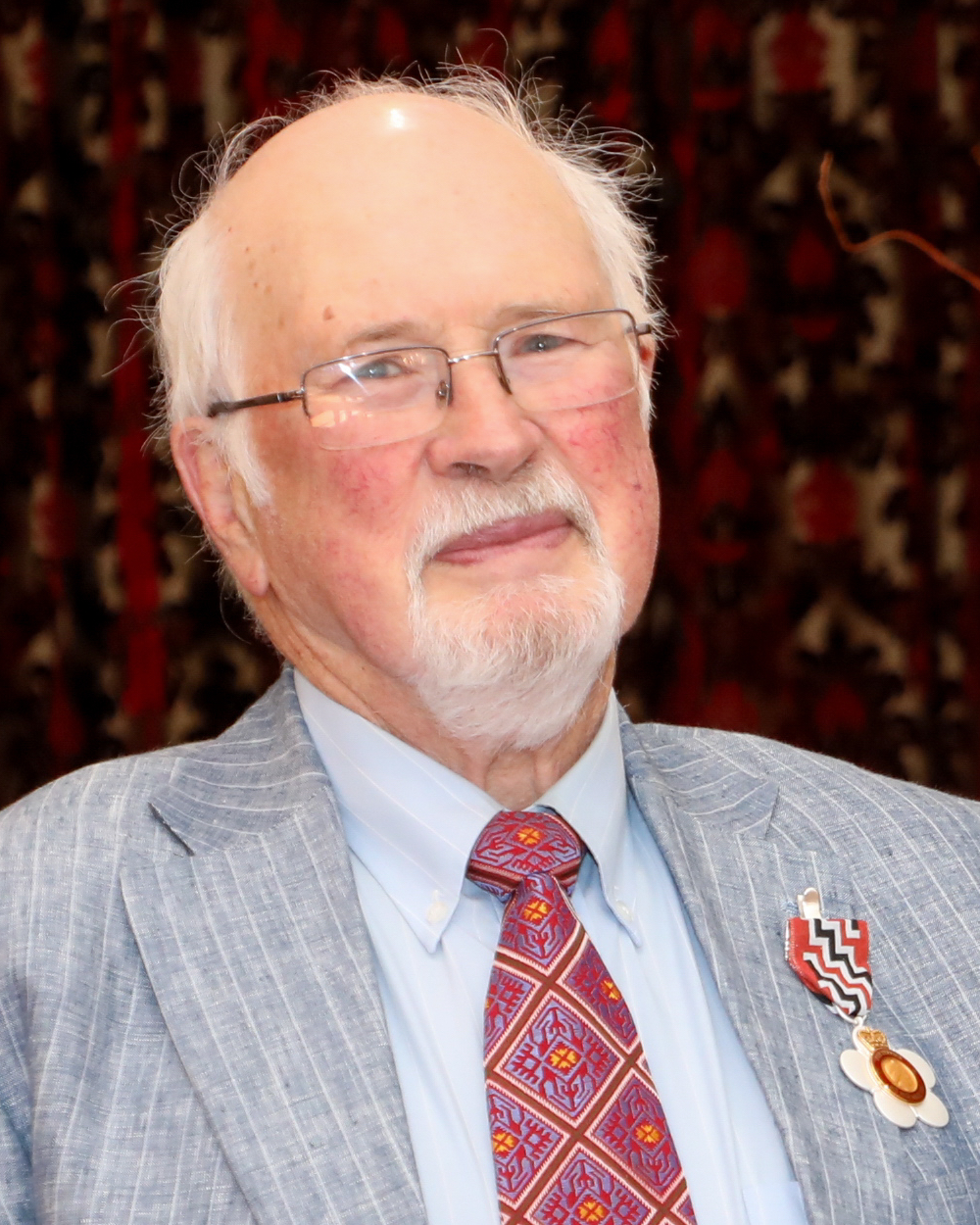
Les Molloy

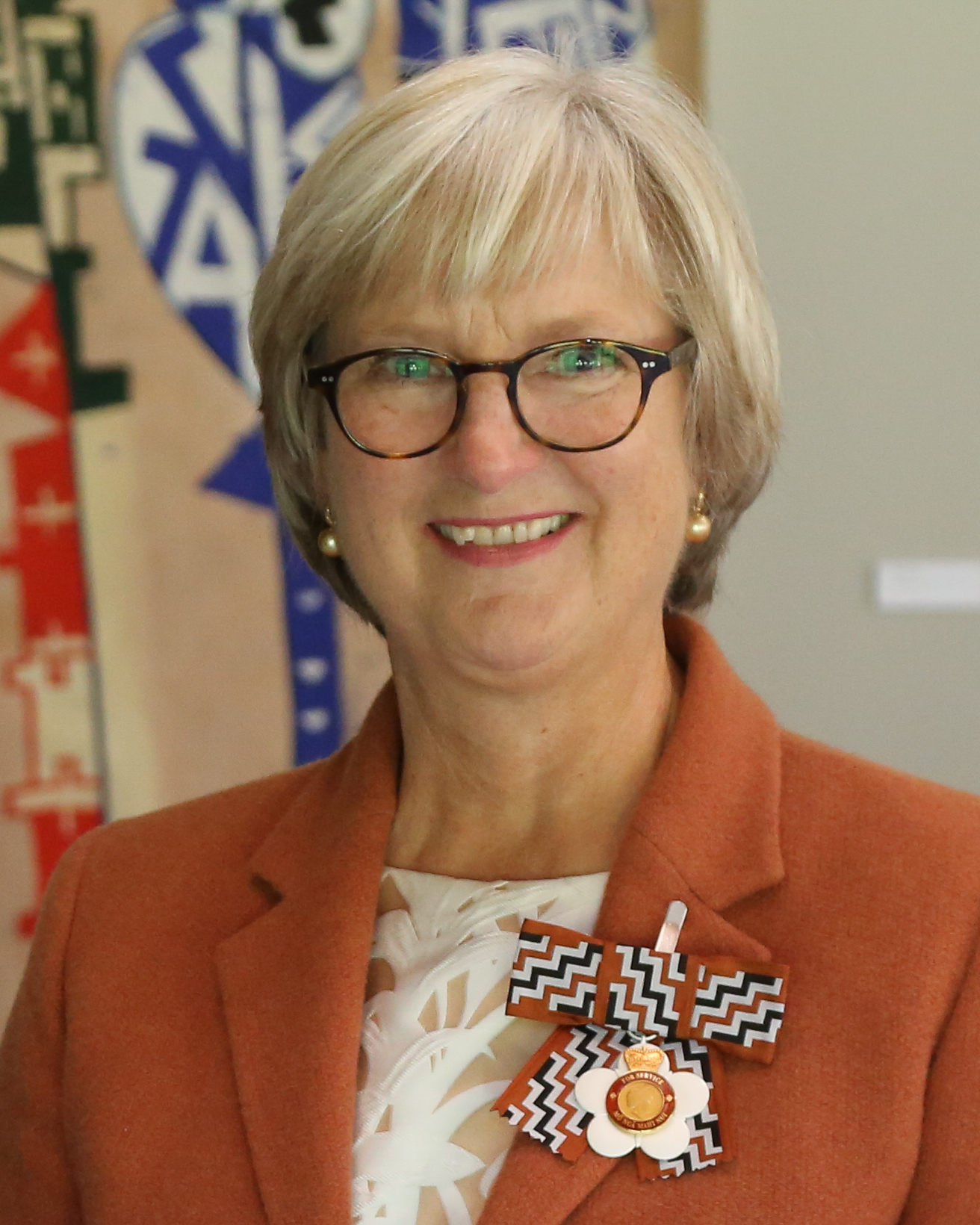
Julie Read

== Queen's Service Medal (QSM) ==
- William Michael Anderson – of Pukete. For services to Māori education and the community.
- Jennifer Louise Andrews JP – of Springlands. For services to seniors and local government.
- Bishop Ross Graham Bay OStJ – of Parnell. For services to Fire and Emergency New Zealand and the community.
- Ian Wright Carter – of Hahei. For services to Fire and Emergency New Zealand and the community.
- Ami Chand – of Kelston. For services to ethnic communities.
- David James Clarke – of Arrowtown. For services to heritage preservation.
- Michael Compton Cole – of Somerville. For services to the Coastguard and the RSA.
- Ronald Leslie Cooke – of Manunui. For services to historical research.
- Glenise Audrey Day OStJ – of Chatham Islands. For services to the community.
- Dr Talduwa Gamage Chandrasoma Asoka Dias – of Hillsborough. For services to health and the Sri Lankan community.
- Eleanor Joyce Doig – of Musselburgh. For services to the community.
- Llewelyn Phillip Duval JP – of Mount Pleasant. For services to the community.
- Christine Joy Greengrass – of Kaiapoi. For services to the community. (Note: Deceased. Her Majesty's approval of this award took effect on 14 May 2022, prior to the date of death.)
- Barbara Anne Hanna – of Tapanui. For services to the community.
- Susan Elizabeth Hume – of Avonhead. For services to education.
- Mervyn Paul Huxford – of Orewa. For services to hockey and the community.
- Samuel Bruce Inder – of Naseby. For services to the community.
- Nedra Julia Johnson – of Beckenham. For services to the community and education.
- Sister Cynthia May Kearney – of Te Hapara. For services to missionary work and the community.
- Paul Klemick – of Mornington. For services to historical research.
- Jeanette Margaret Leebody JP – of Caversham. For services to netball and the community.
- Gabrielle-Sisifo Blanche Dunlop Makisi – of Melrose. For services to Pacific communities and education.
- Neil Rex McDermott – of Waikiwi. For services to music promotion and the community.
- Craig Sutherland McFarlane – of Papamoa Beach. For services to education and music.
- Margaret McKibbin – of Taradale. For services to Scouting.
- Reverend Vaelua Salafai Mika – of Papatoetoe. For services to church ministry and the Samoan community.
- Mary Elizabeth Money – of Silverstream. For services to Girl Guides, women and the community.
- Larry Alexander Morgan – of Taradale. For services to canoe sports and viticulture.
- Vivien Joy Morton – of Whitby. For services to the community.
- Ellen Huia Norman – of Māngere East. For services to Māori and mental health.
- Reverend Hiueni Nuku – of Whitby. For services to Tongan and Pacific communities.
- Roy John Opie – of Otaihanga. For services to the community.
- Harry Earl Pawsey – of Hawarden. For services to advocacy and conservation.
- Virginia Ann Pawsey – of Hawarden. For services to advocacy and conservation.
- Pushpa Devi Prasad – of Whanganui East. For services to the community.
- Graeme Ernest Rice – of Ravensbourne. For services to traffic and road safety.
- Elizabeth Ann Robbie – of Invercargill. For service to historical research.
- Vaipou Saluni – of Waiwhetū. For services to education and the Pacific community.
- Michael Scrivener – of Karori. For services to ethnic communities and refugees.
- Winifred Solomon – of Riverton. For services to Māori culture and heritage.
- Irene Ann Somerville – of Kawaha Point. For services to the community and historical research.
- Yu-Shiun Tang – of Westmorland. For services to Chinese communities and culture.
- Roberta Mihikore Te Huia – of Te Atatū Peninsula. For services to Māori.
- Luther Alafia Toloa QPM JP – of Masterton. For services to the Pacific community.
- Wendy Louise van Delden – of Paraparaumu Beach. For services to music.
- Heather Belle Waldron JP – of Greerton. For services to the community.
- Lynda Ruth Wallace – of Akaroa. For services to heritage preservation and the community.
- Ian David Wilson – of Ōkaihau. For services to conservation.
- Karel James Witten-Hannah – of New Lynn. For services to the community and education.
- William Edward Woods JP – of Springfield. For services to conservation and the community.
- John Kenneth Wyatt – of South Bay. For services to the community.
- Sandra Jean Wyatt – of South Bay. For services to the community.
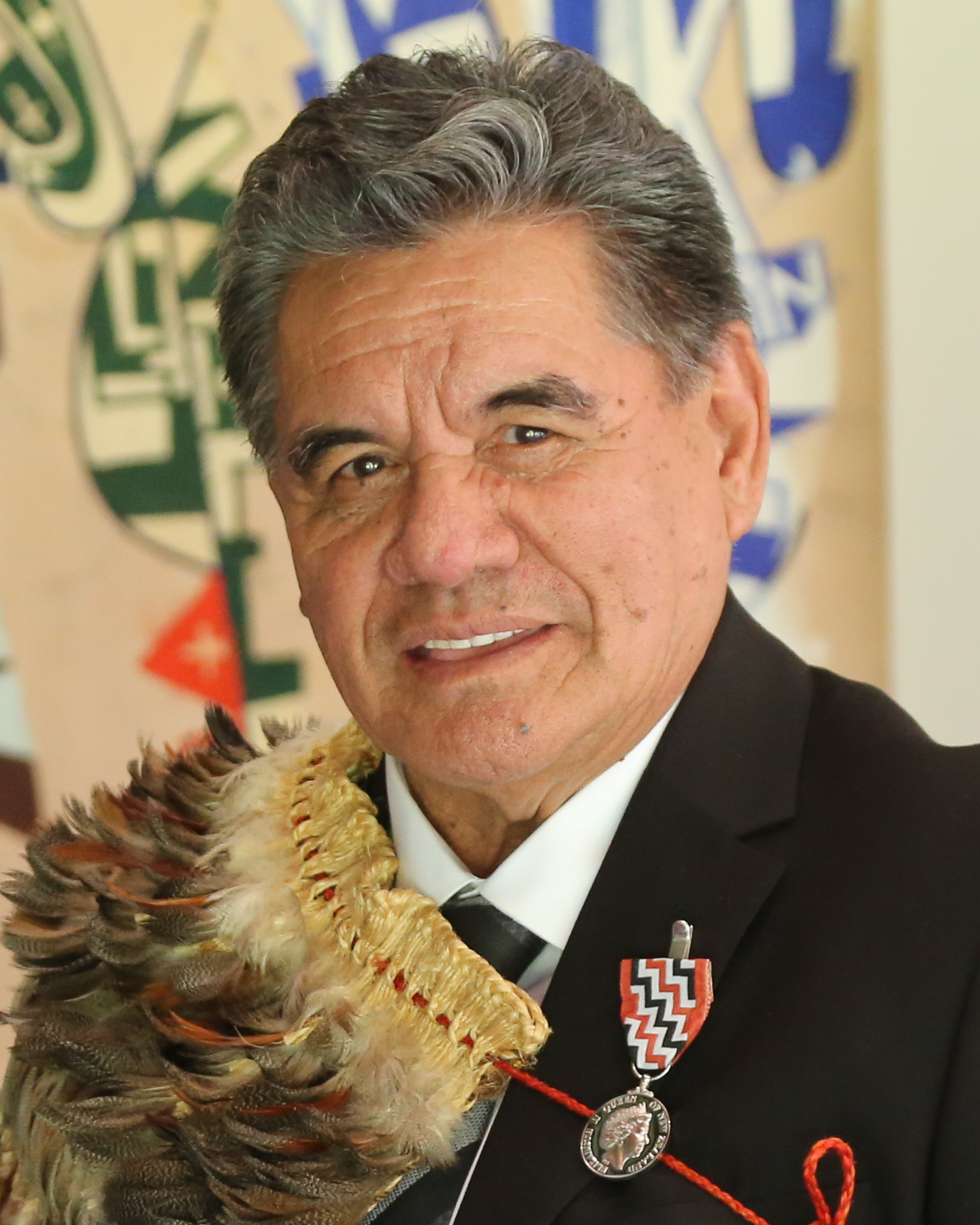
Bill Anderson

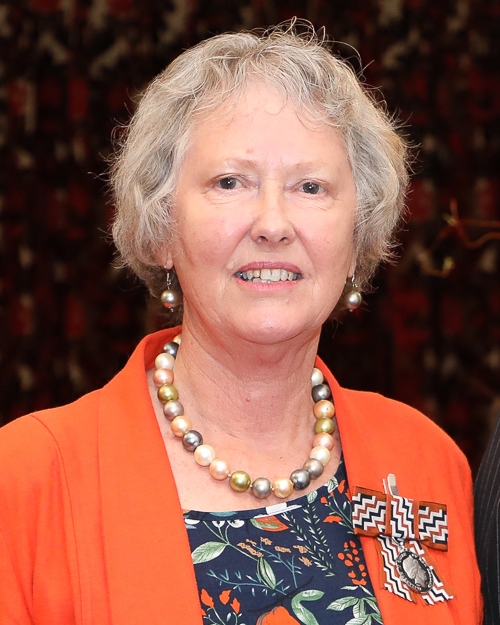
Jenny Andrews

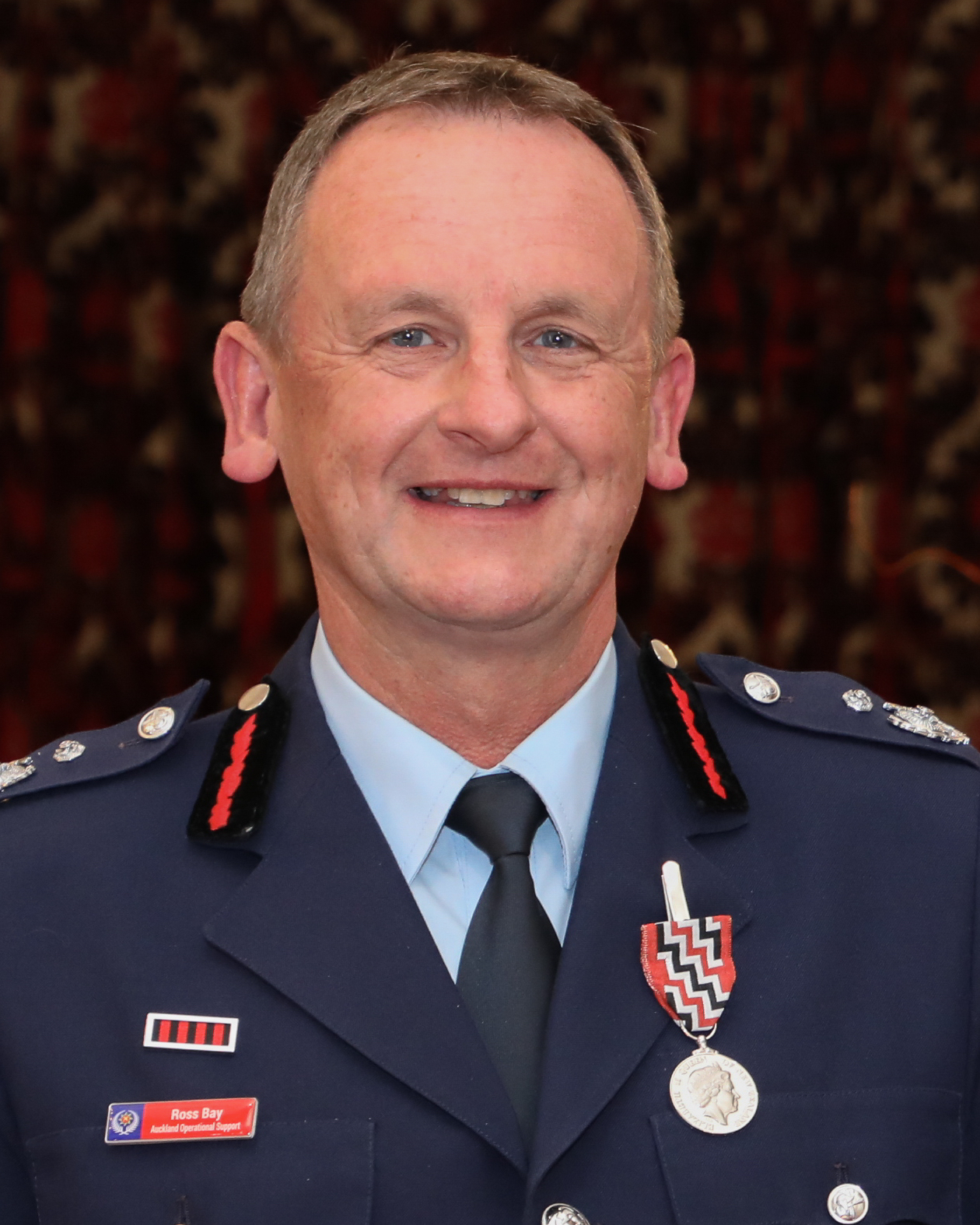
Ross Bay

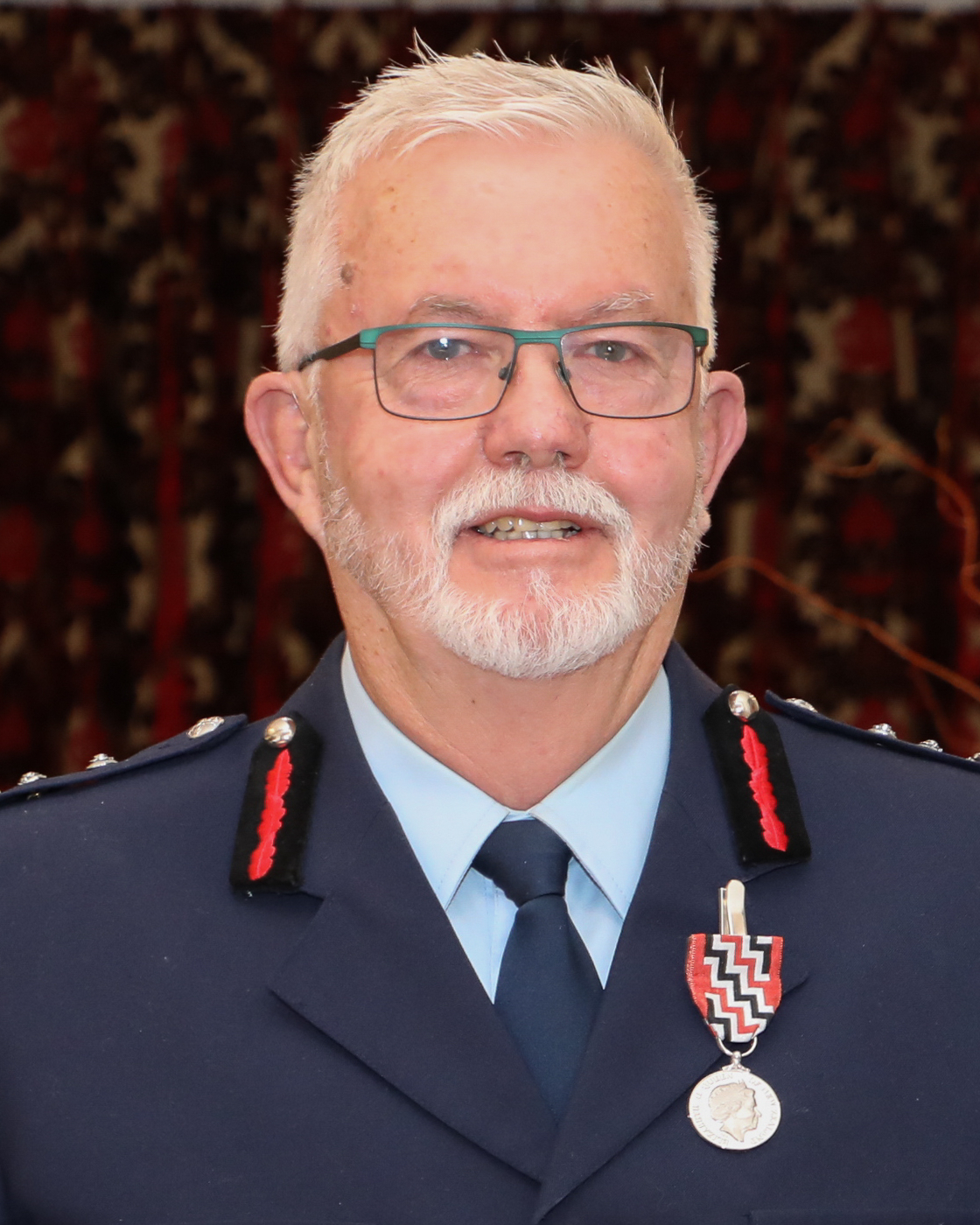
Ian Carter

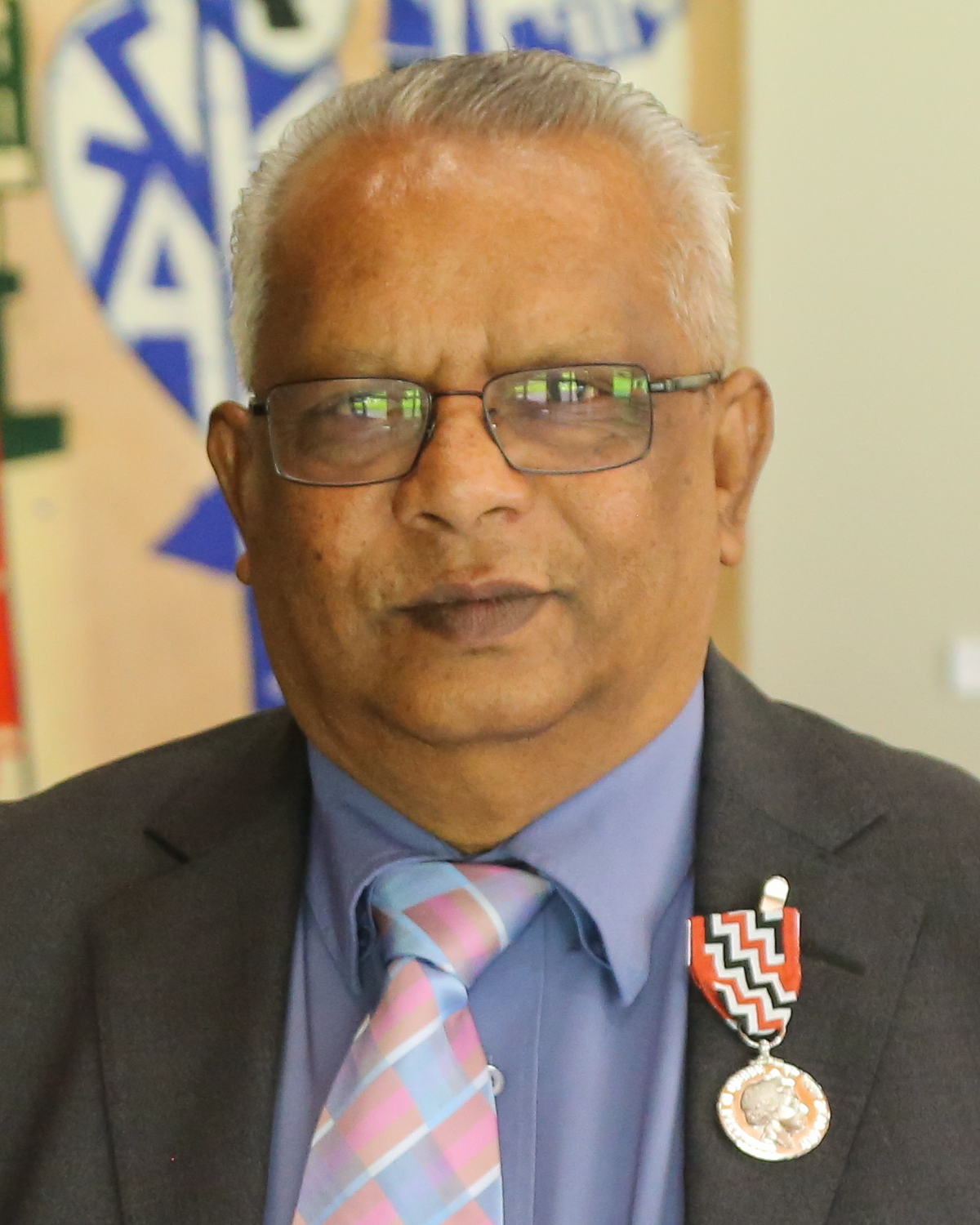
Ami Chand

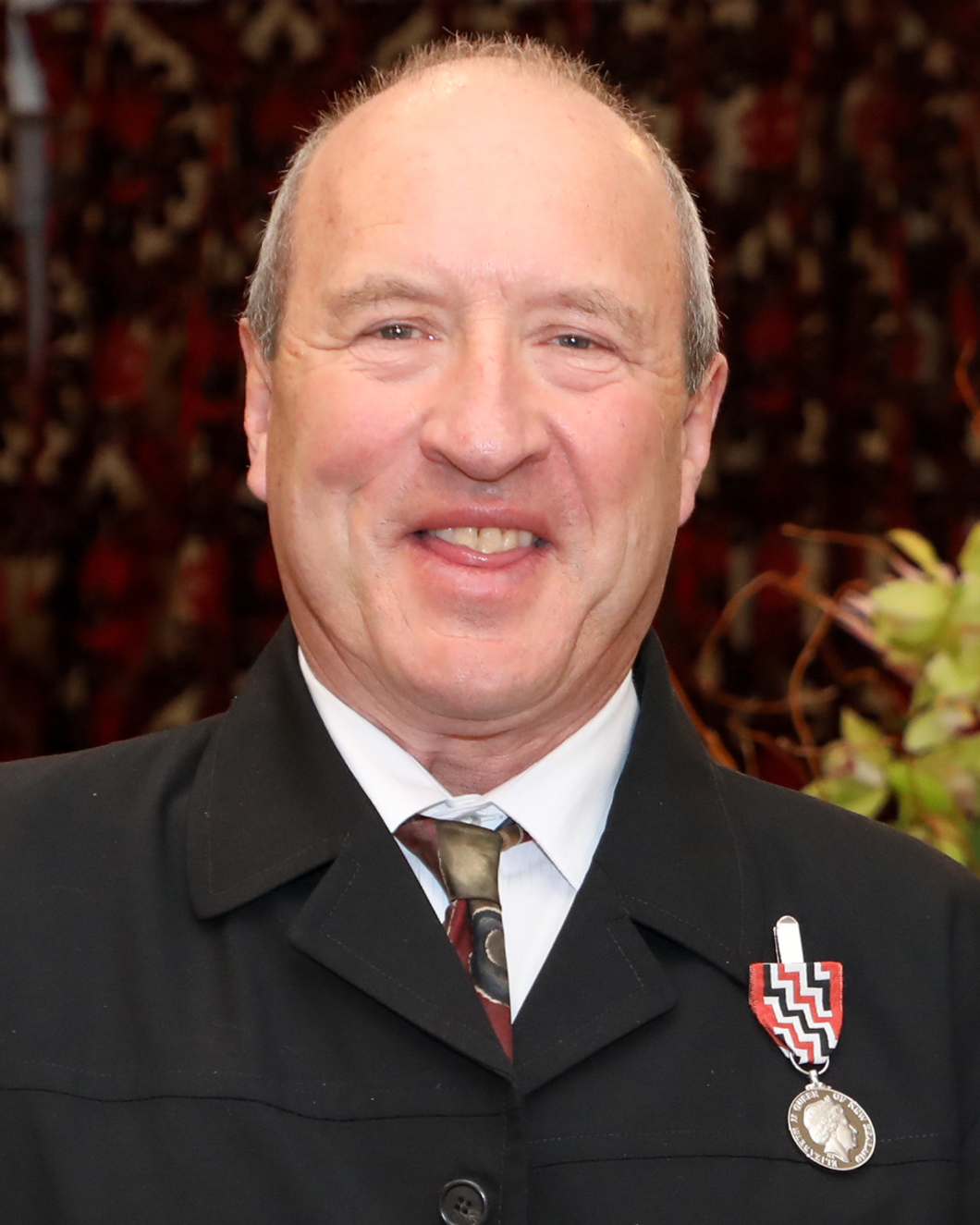
David Clarke

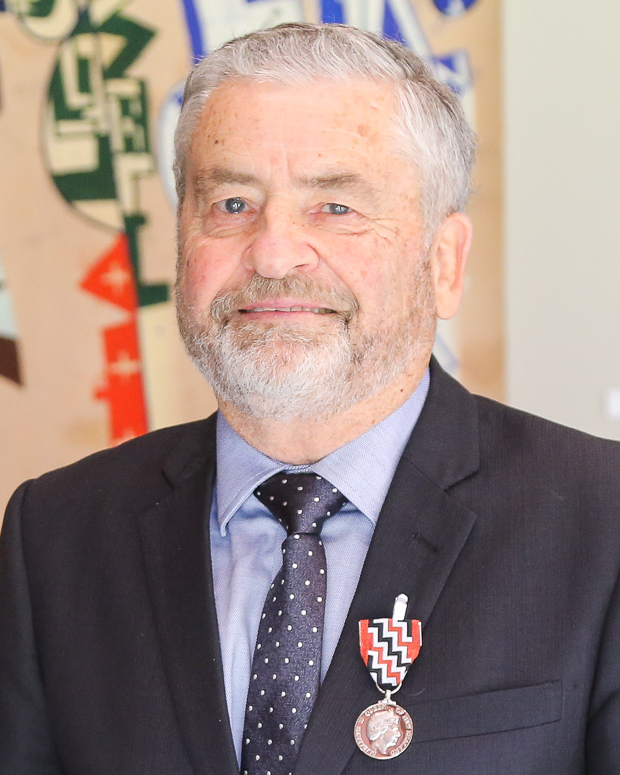
Michael Cole

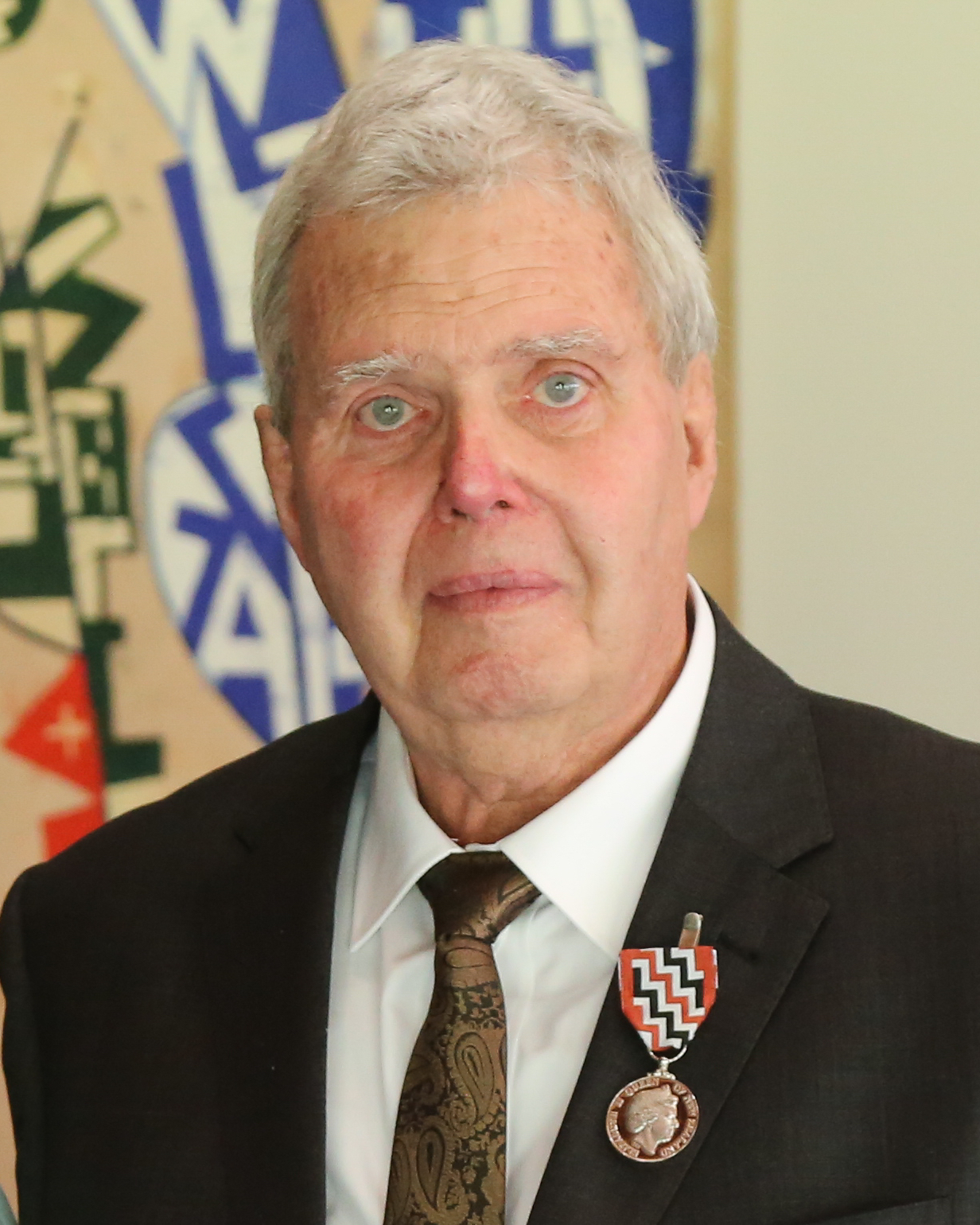
Ron Cooke

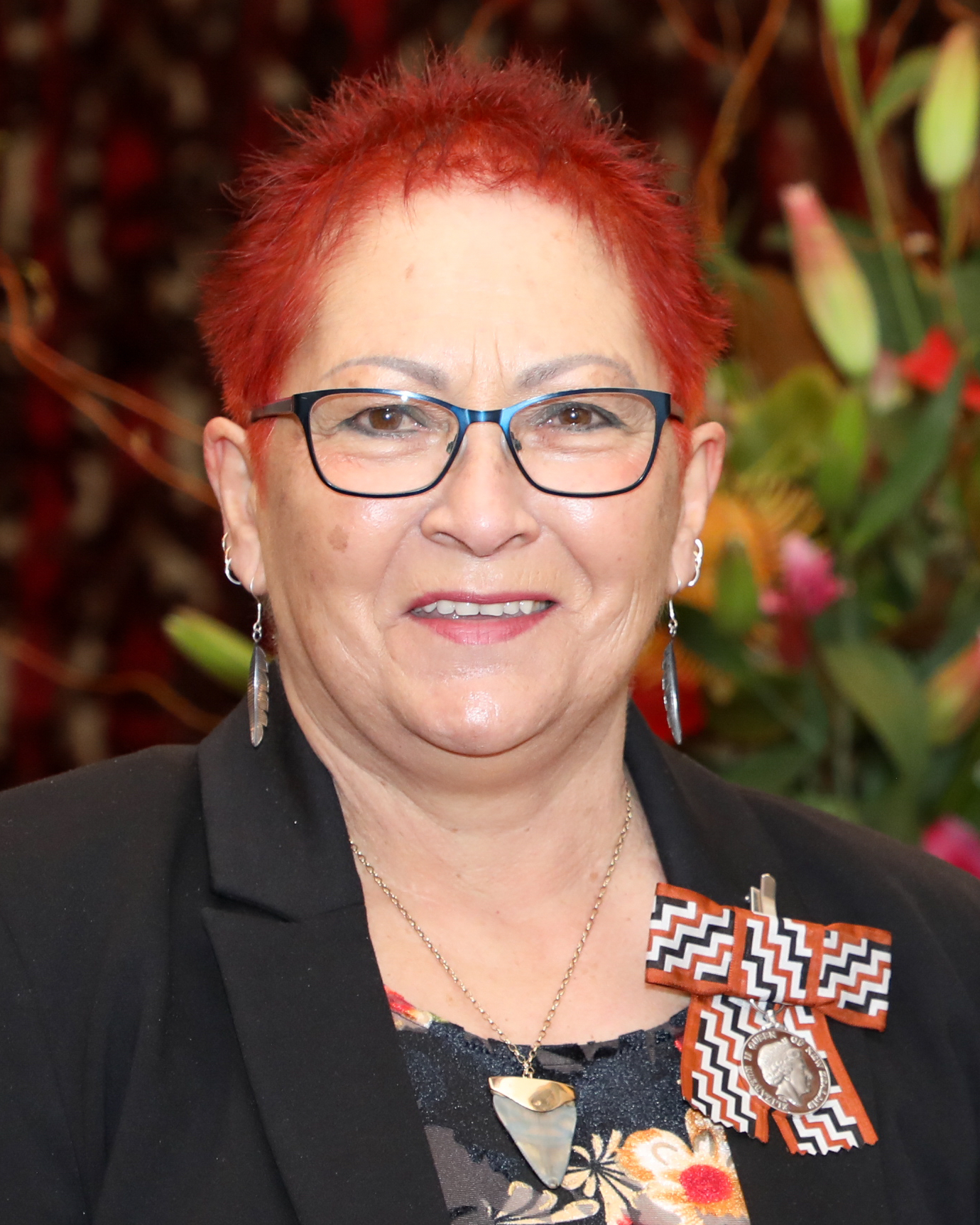
Glenise Day

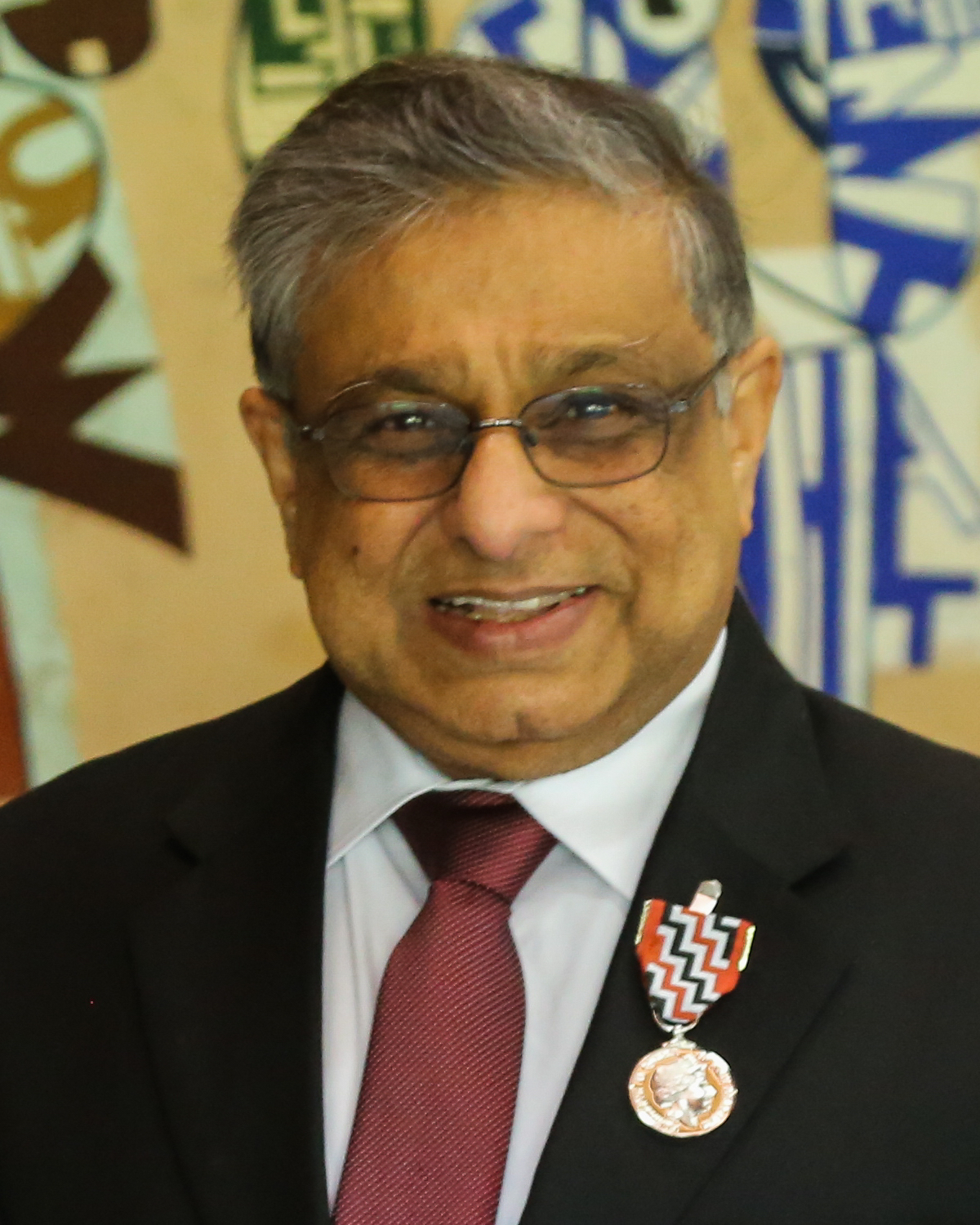
Asoka Dias

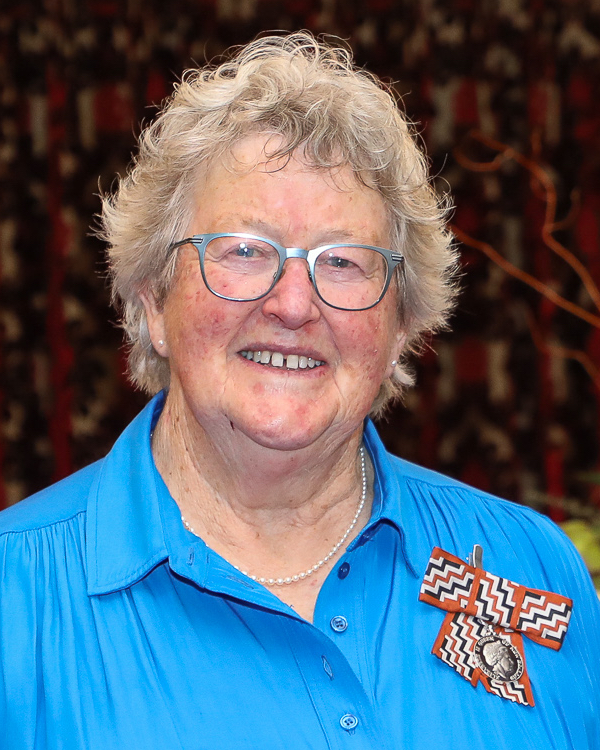
Eleanor Doig

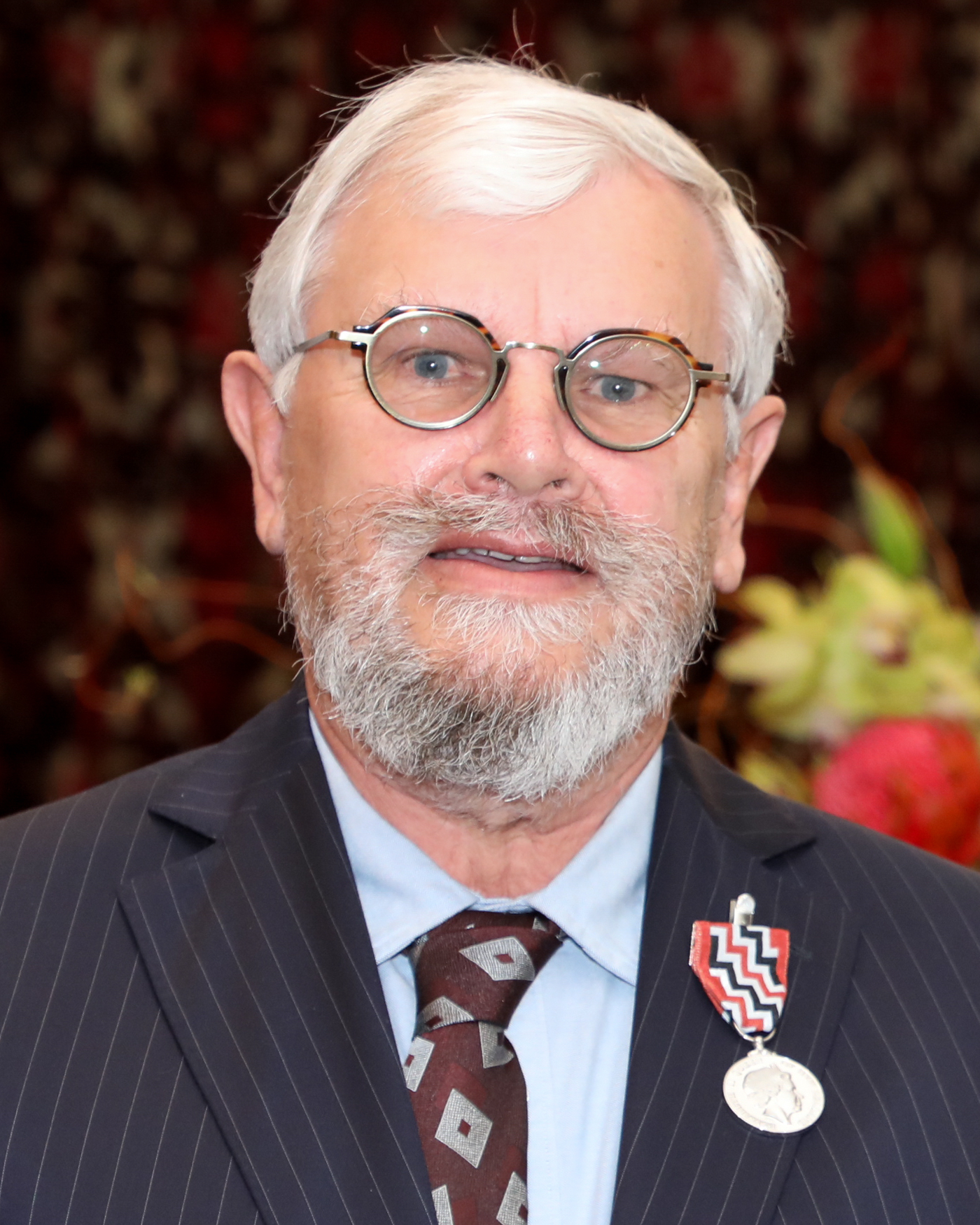
Phillip Duval

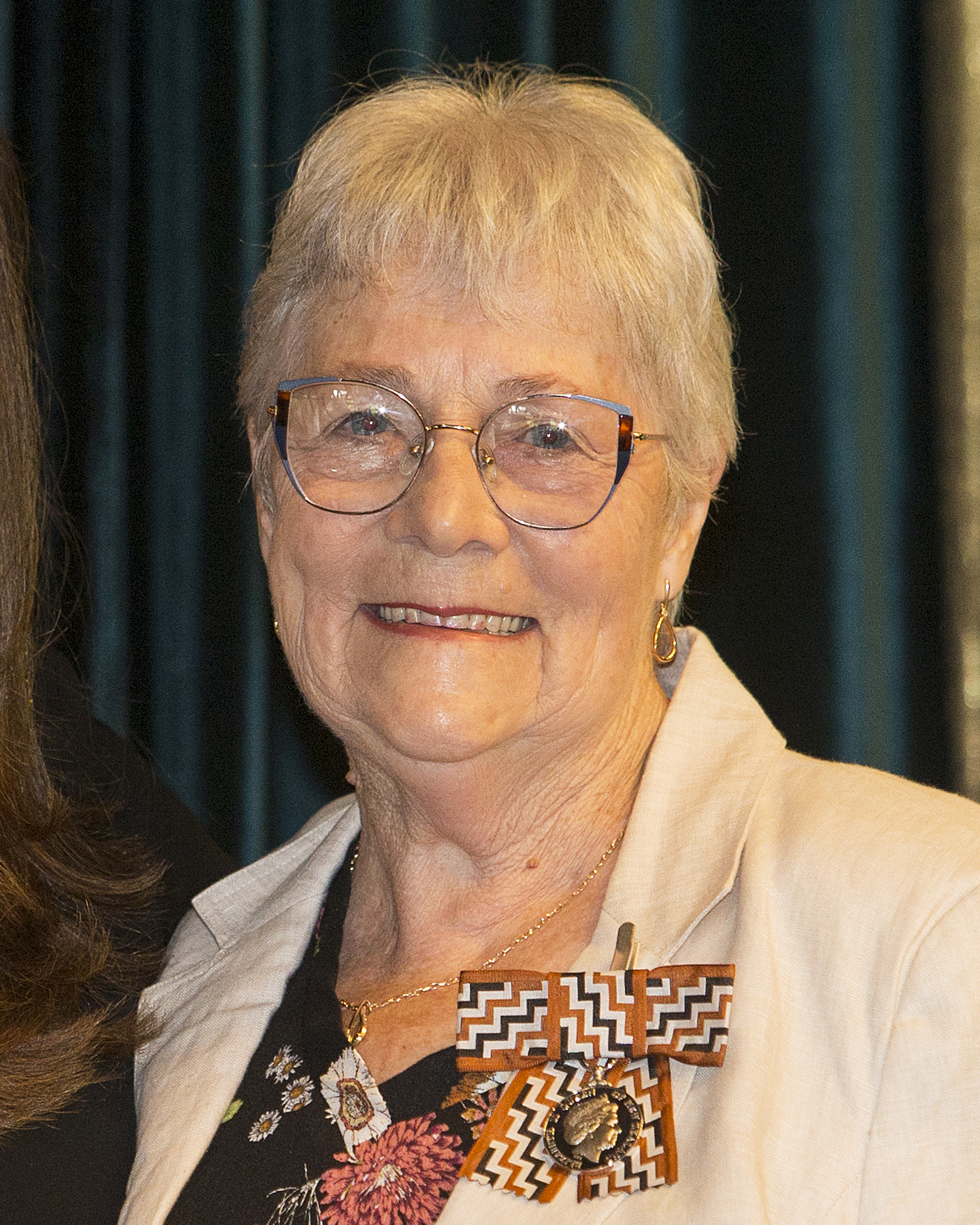
Barbara Hanna

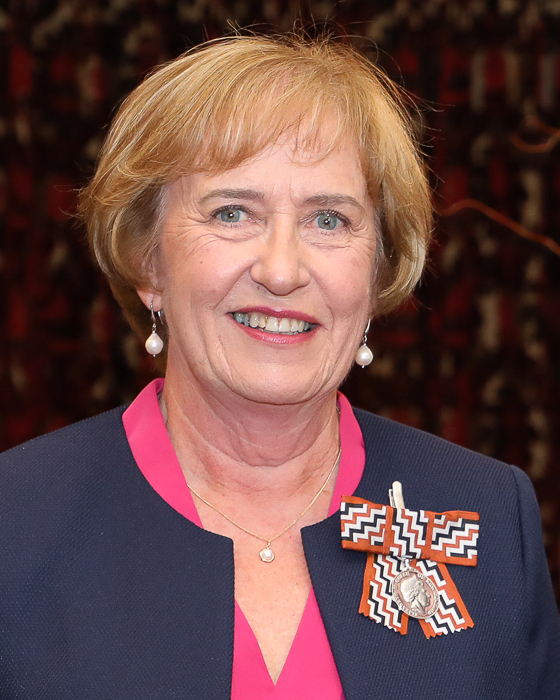
Susan Hume

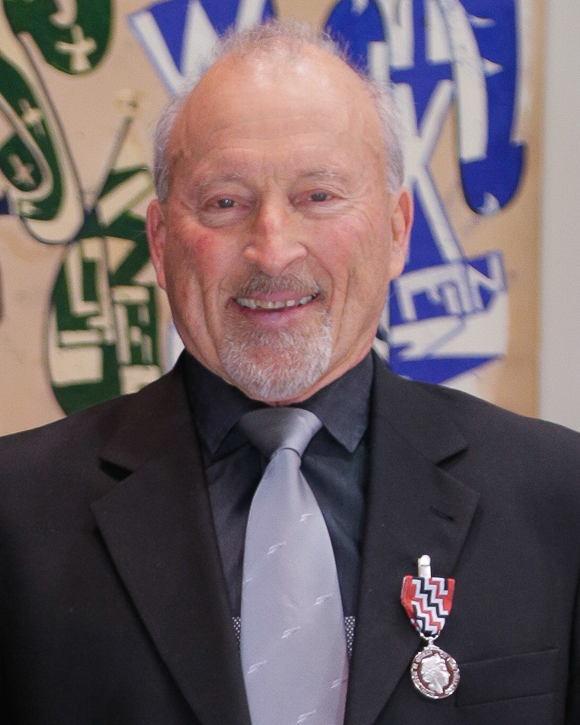
Merv Huxford

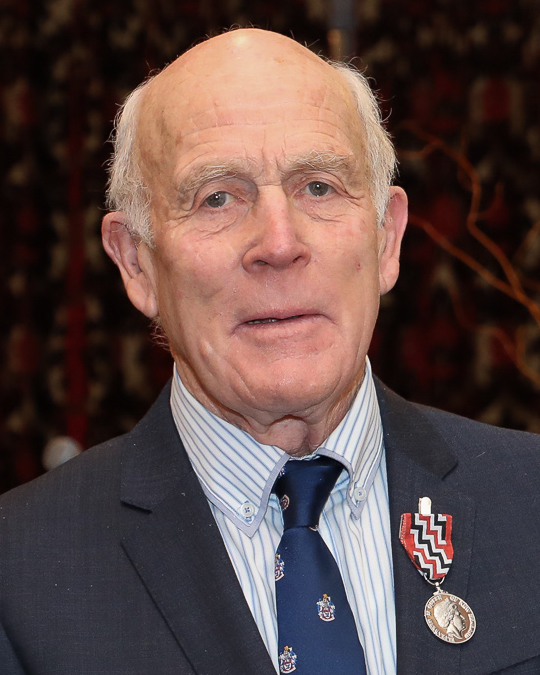
Sam Inder

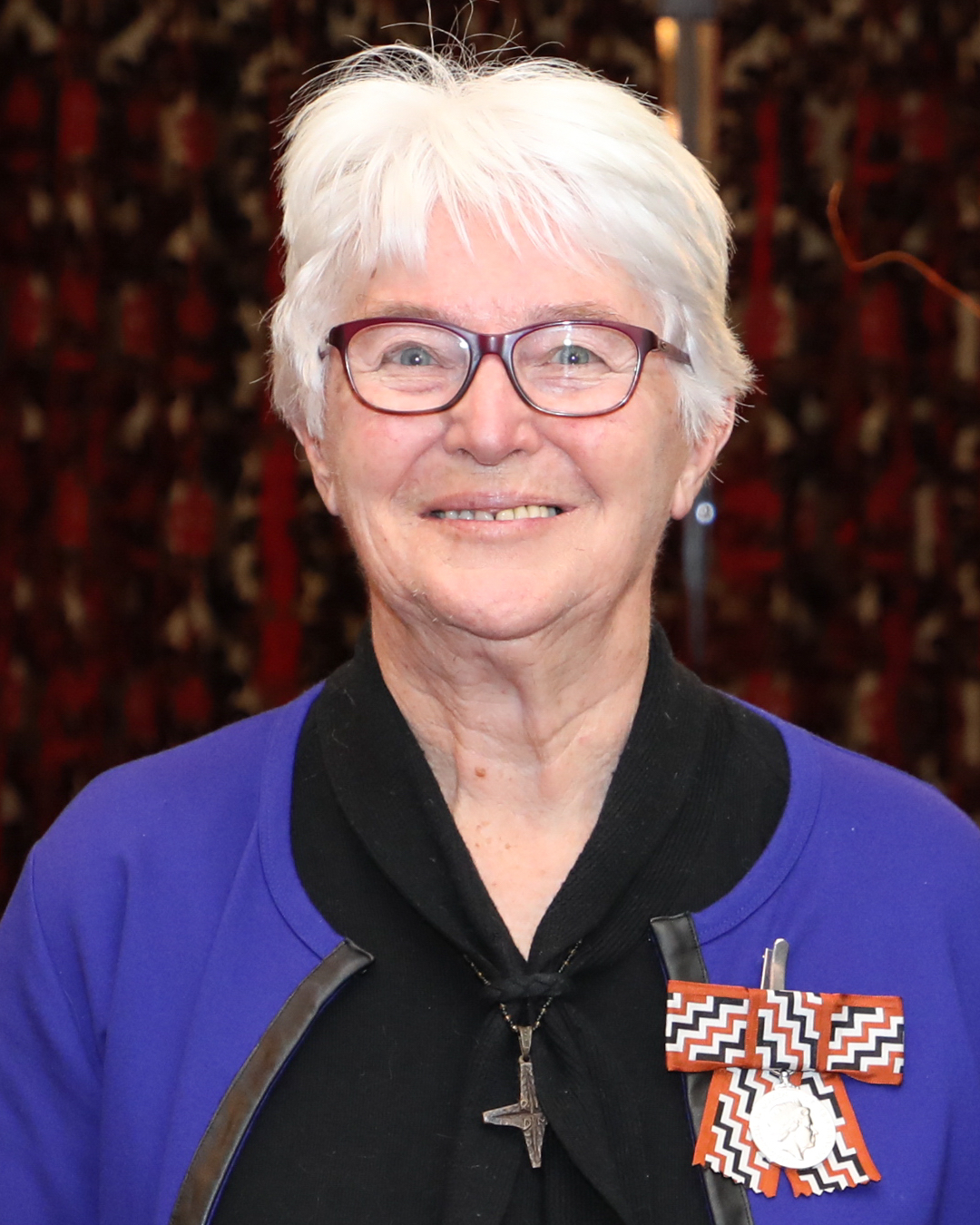
Cynthia Kearney

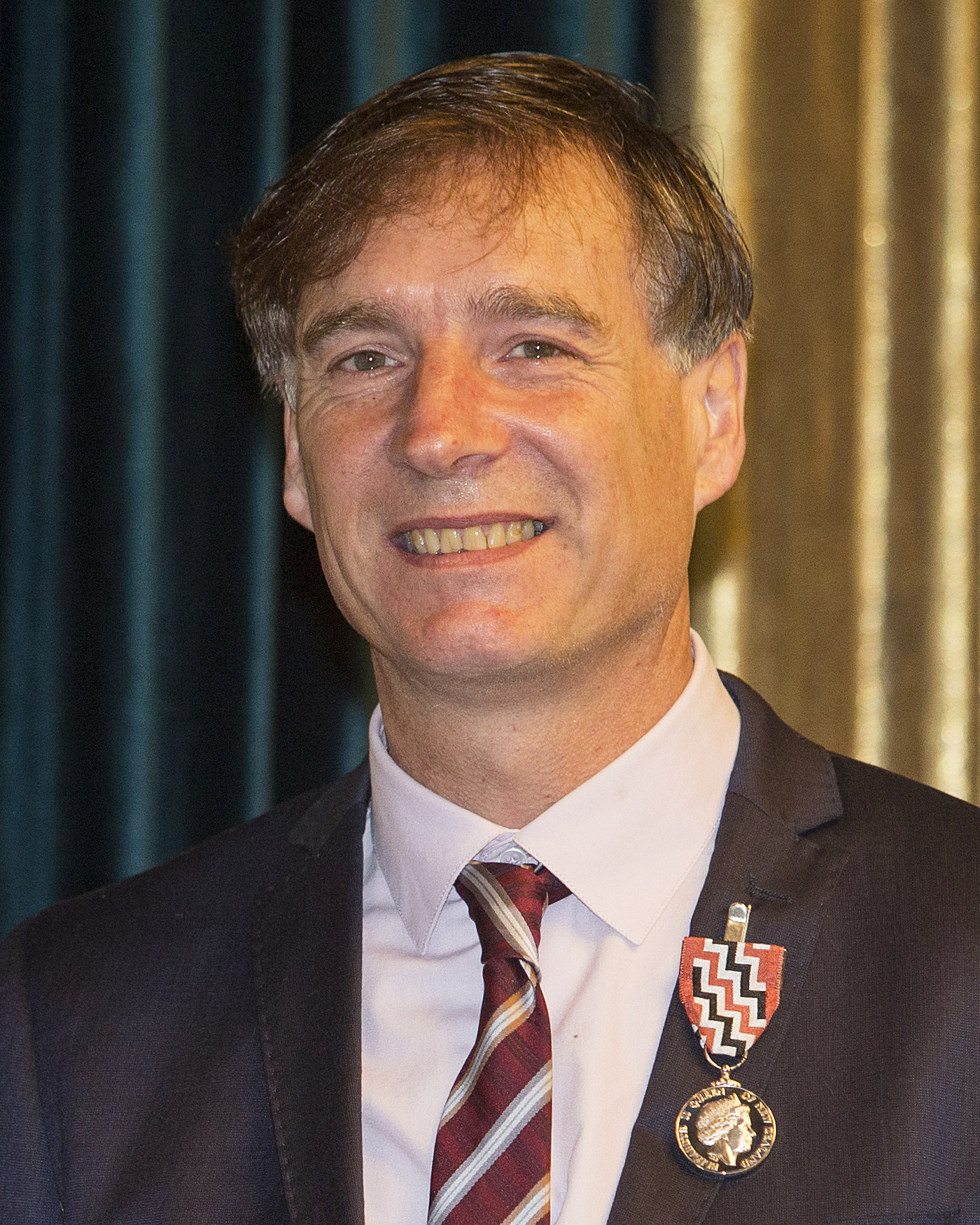
Paul Klemick

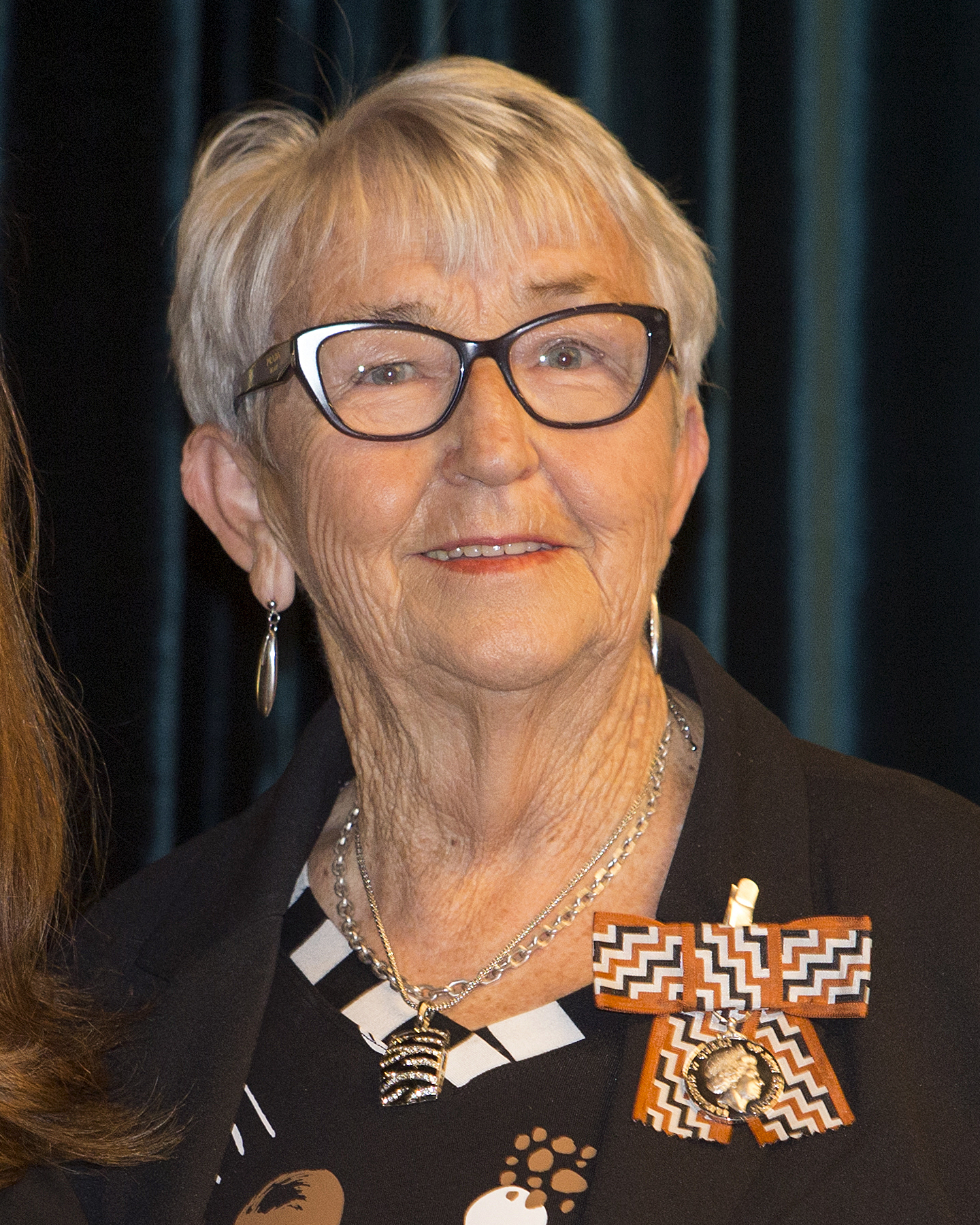
Kate Leebody

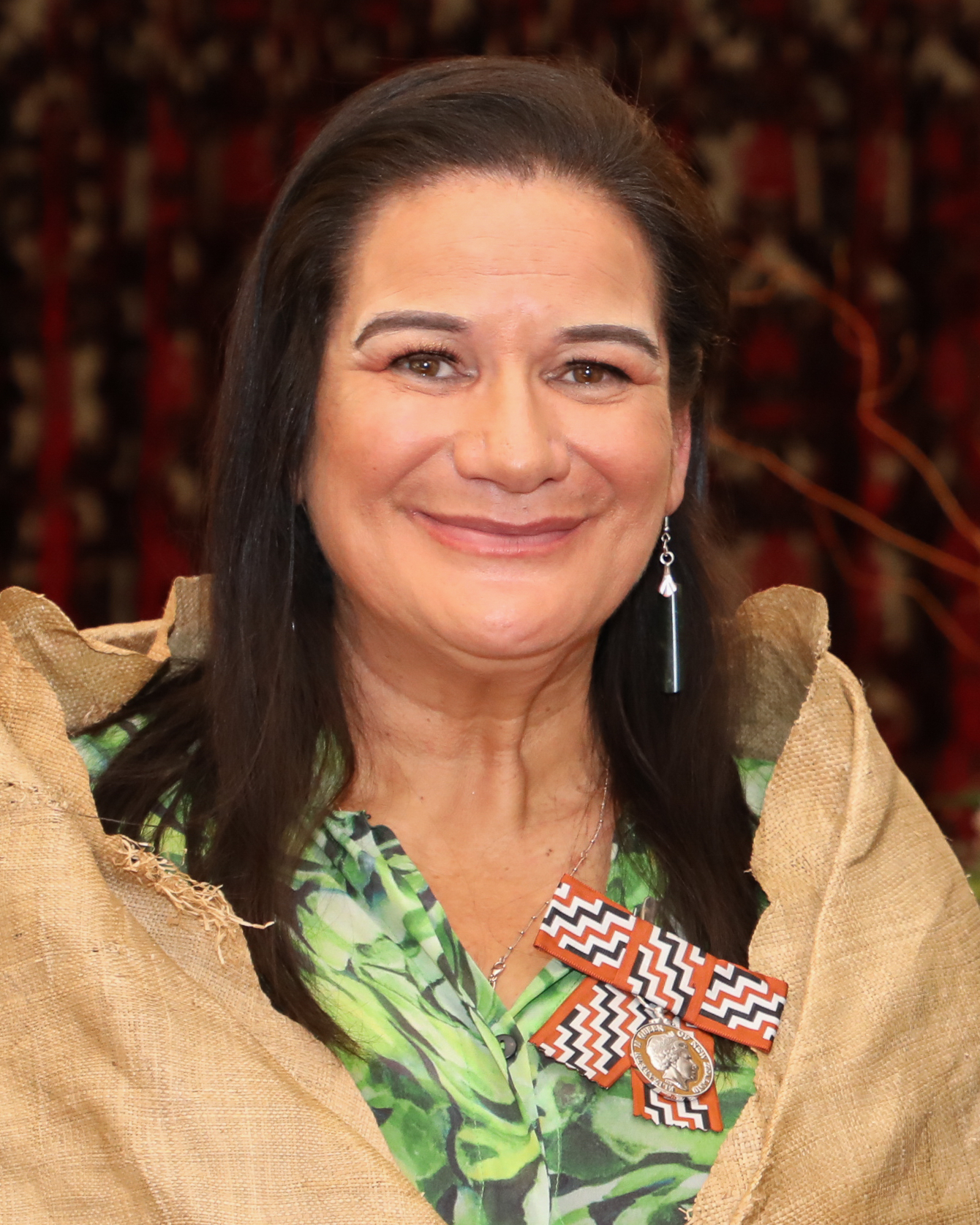
Gabrielle-Sisifo Makisi

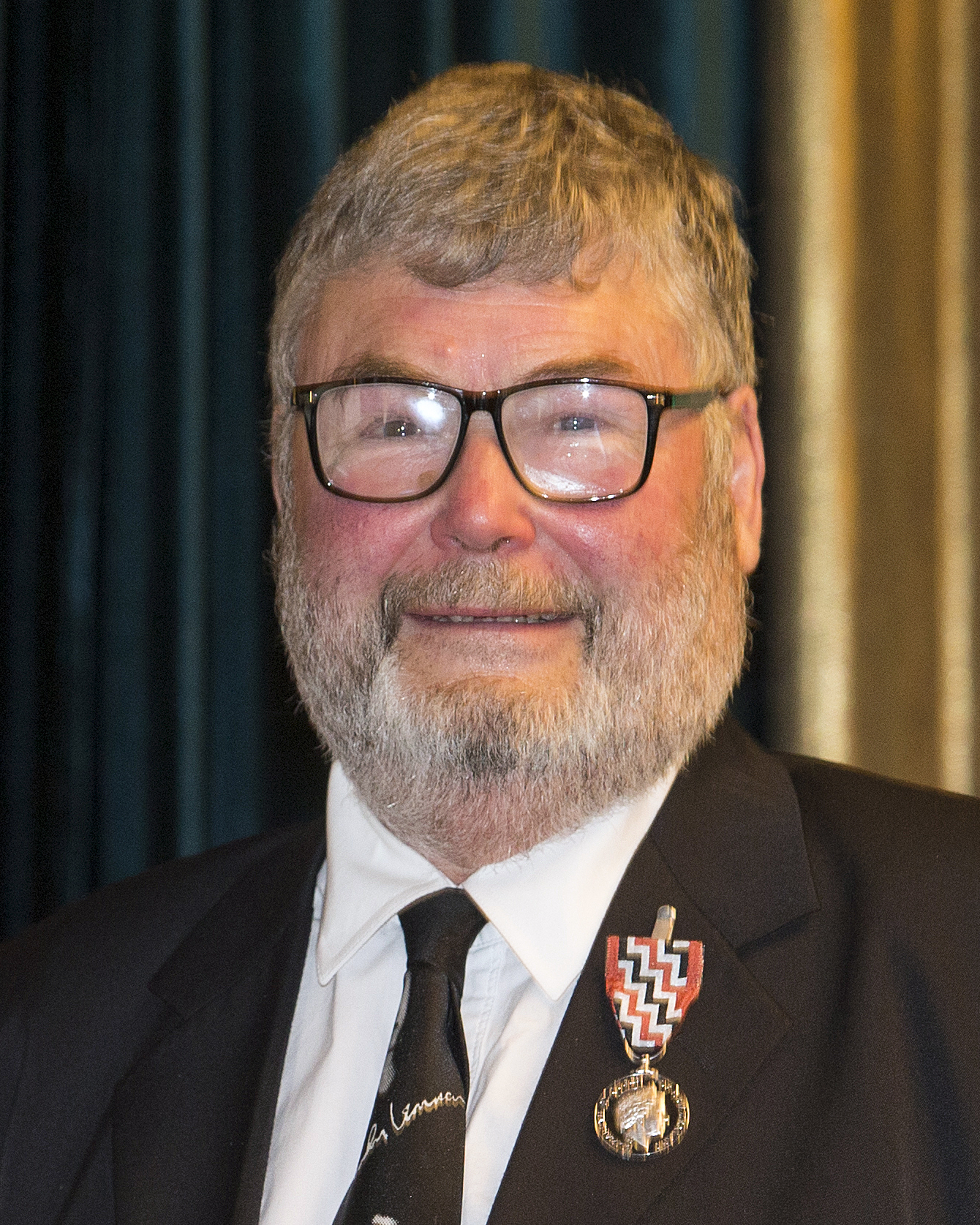
Neil McDermott

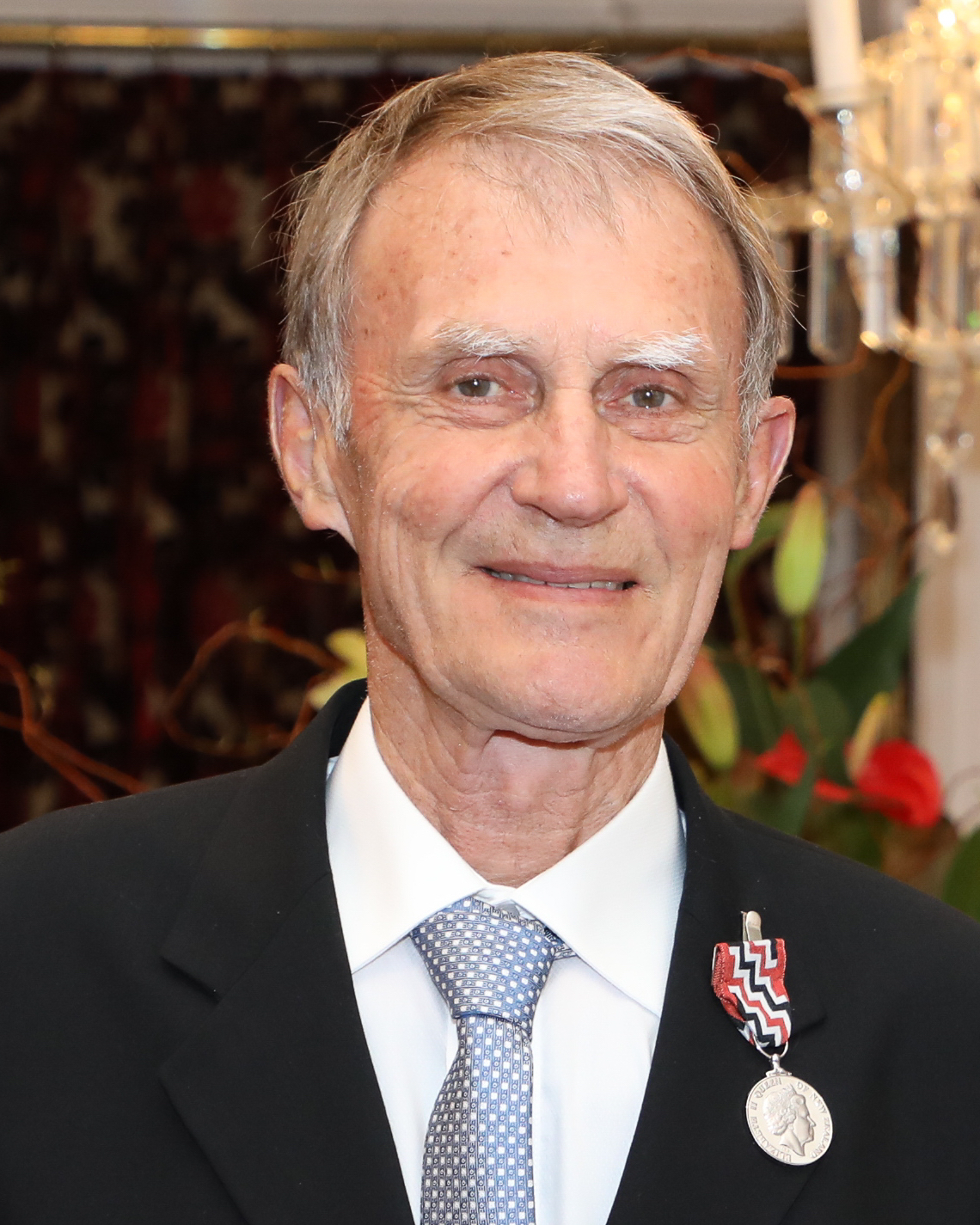
Craig McFarlane

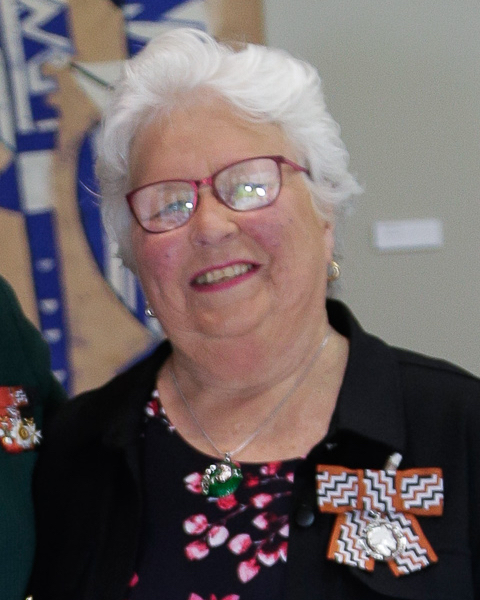
Margaret McKibbin

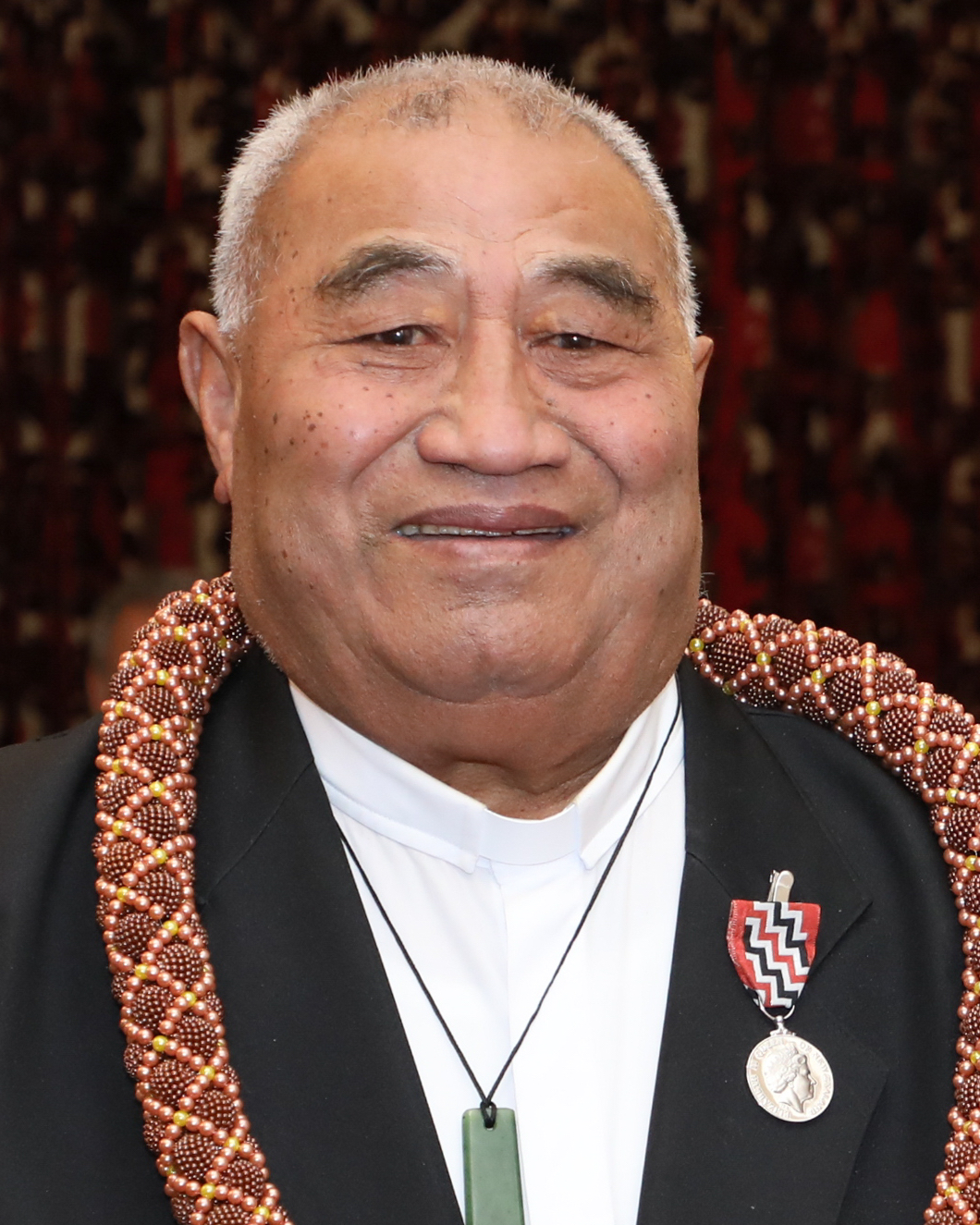
Salafai Mika

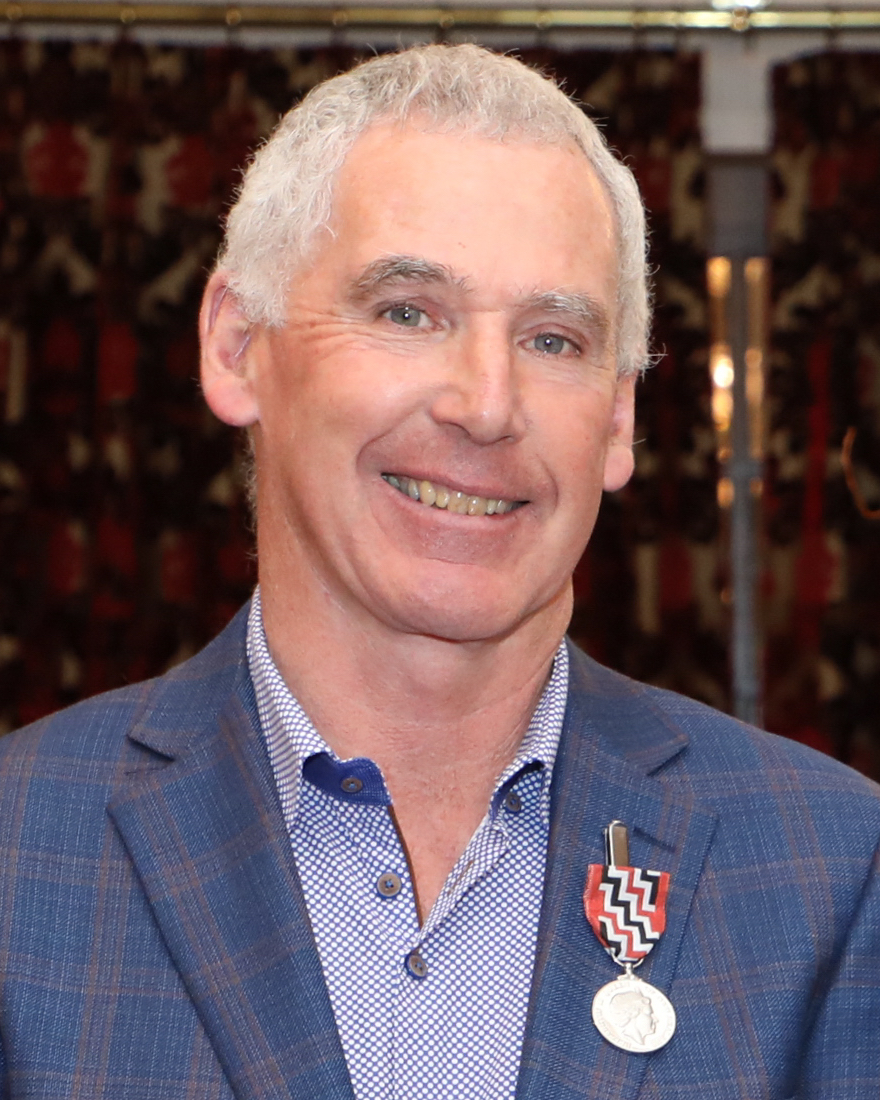
Larry Morgan

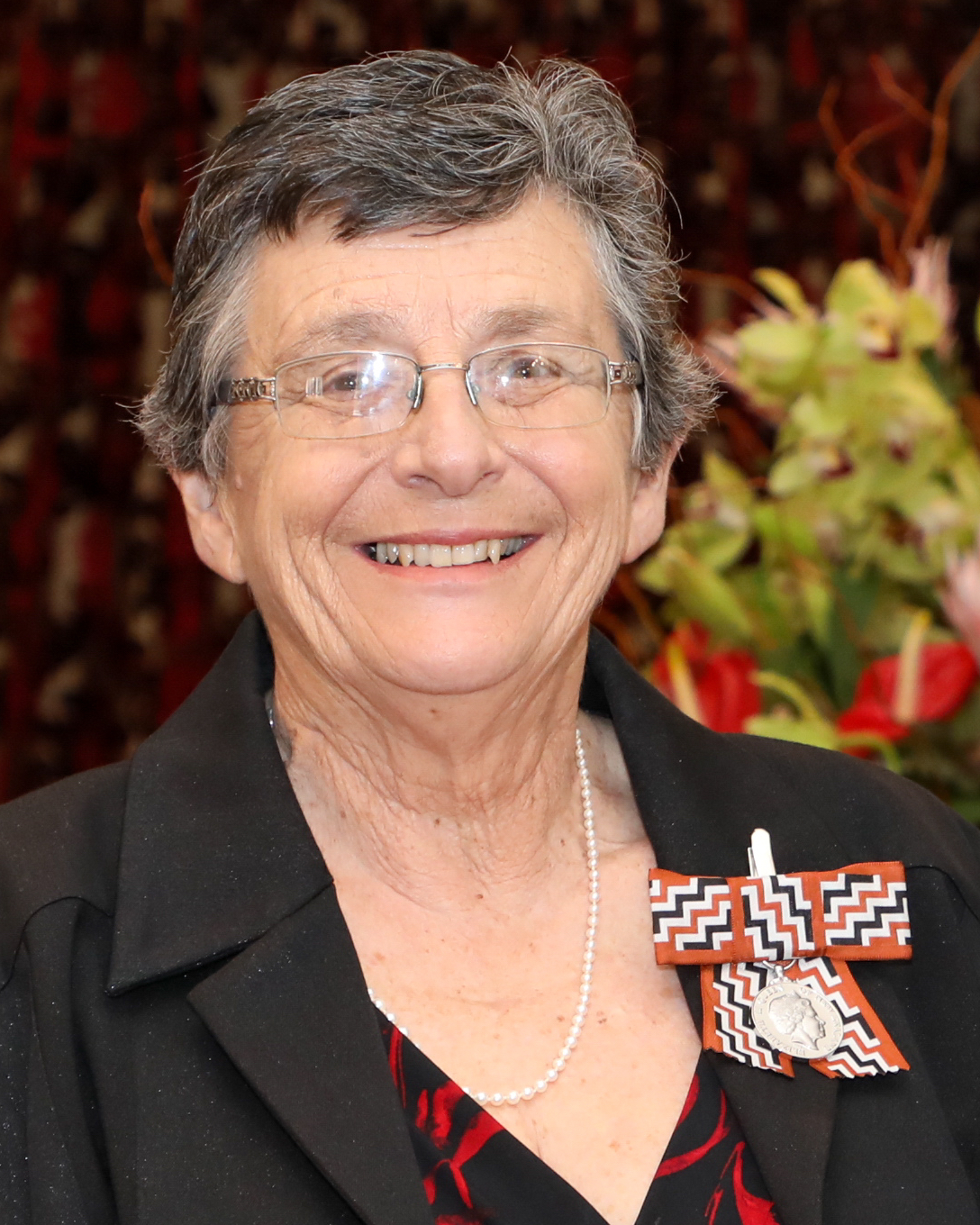
Vivien Morton

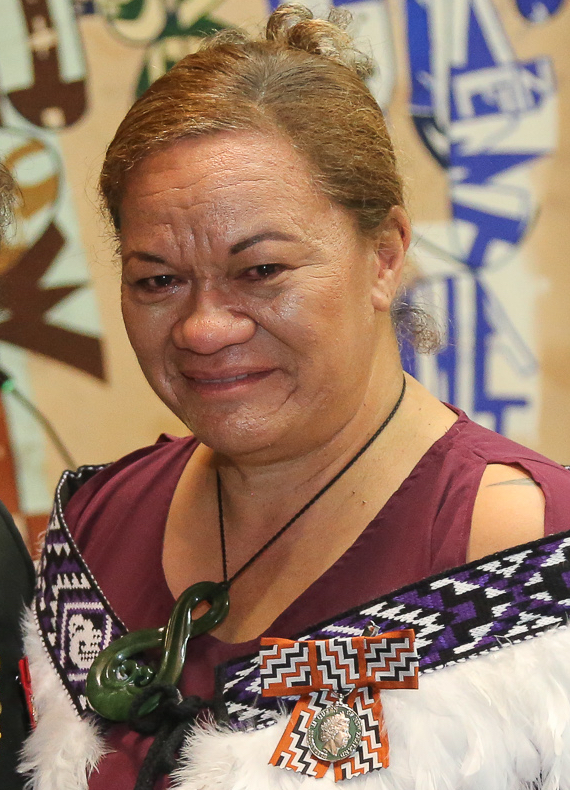
Reremoana Norman

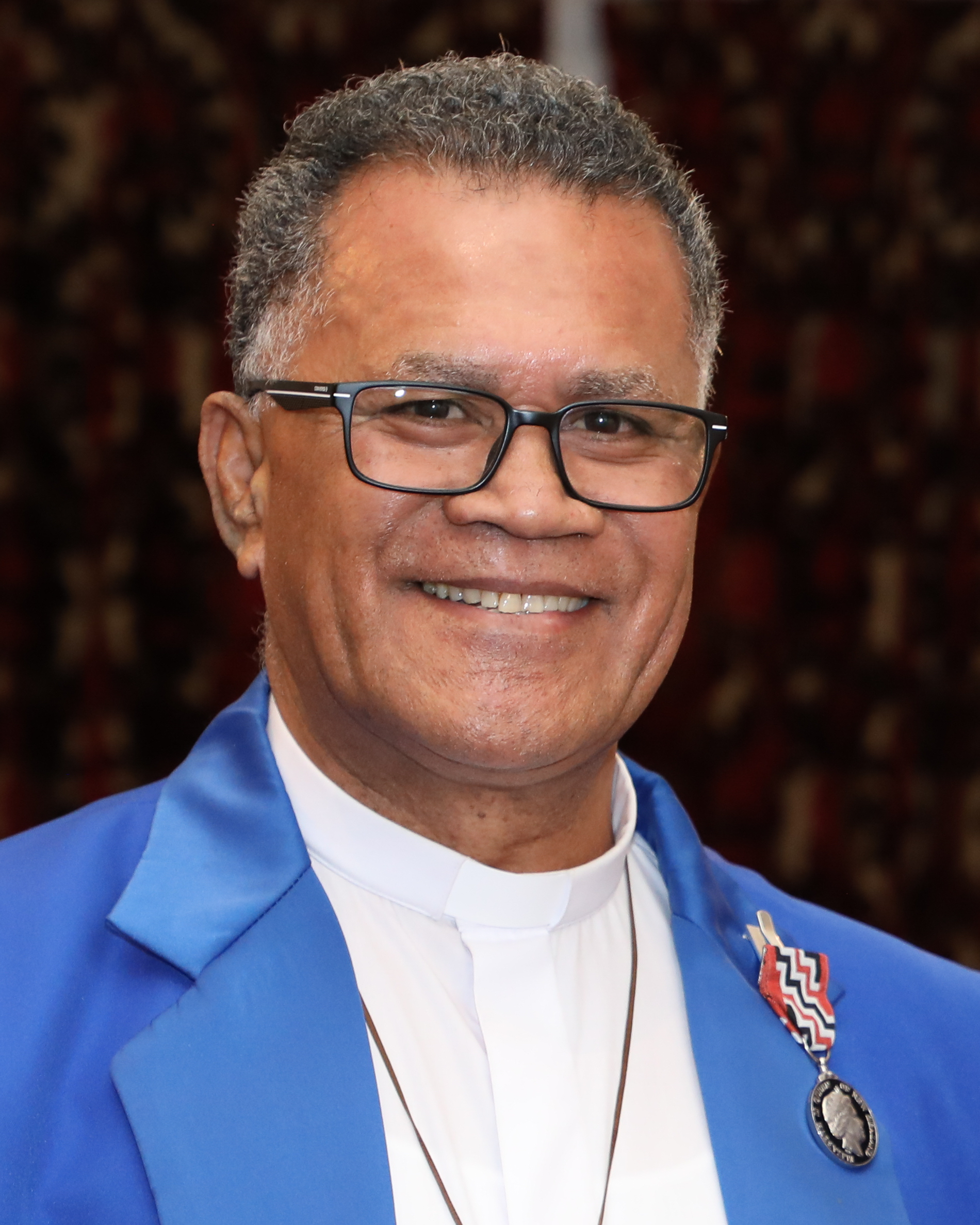
Hiueni Nuku

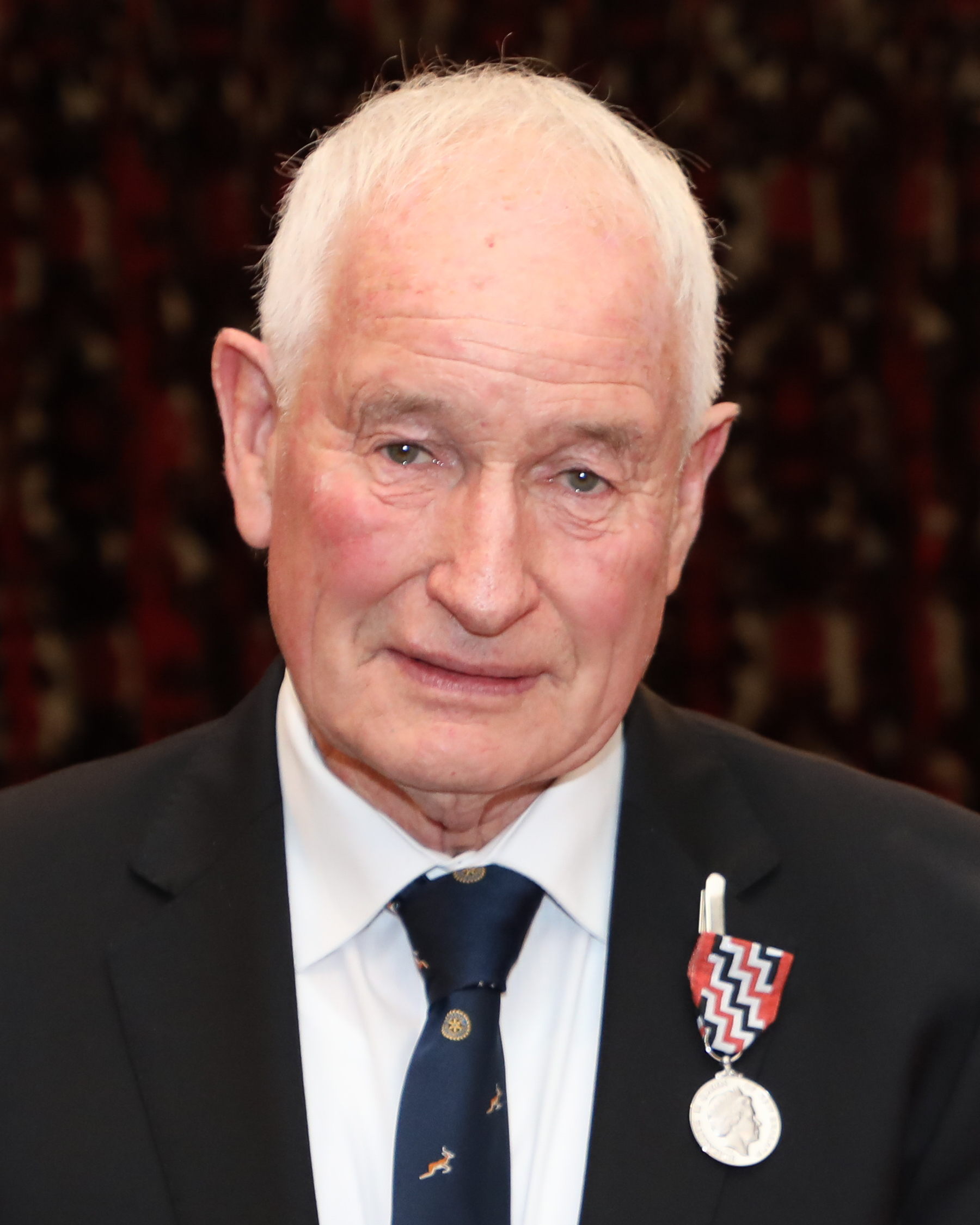
Roy Opie

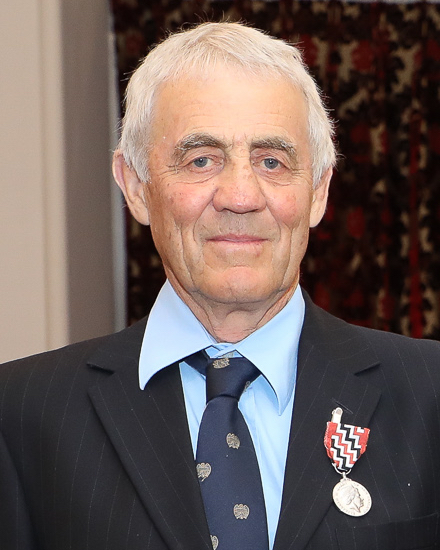
Harry Pawsey

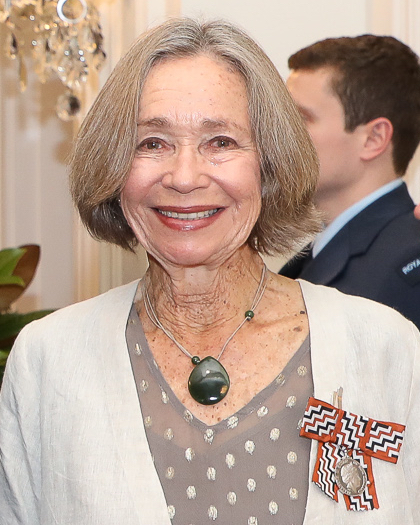
Virginia Pawsey

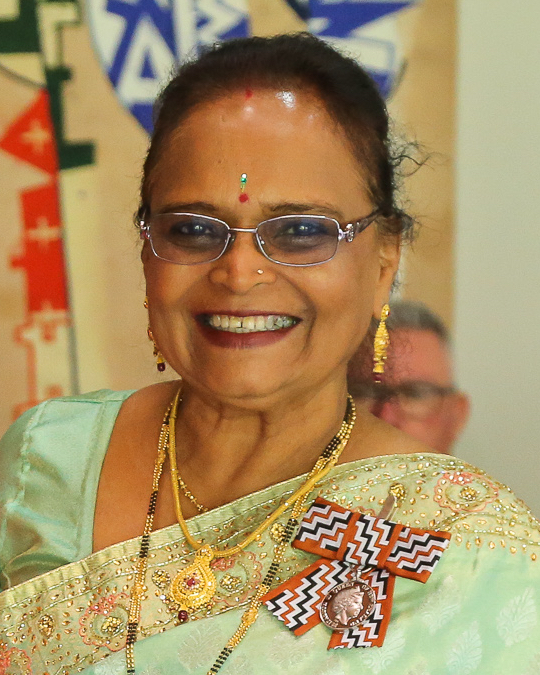
Pushpa Prasad

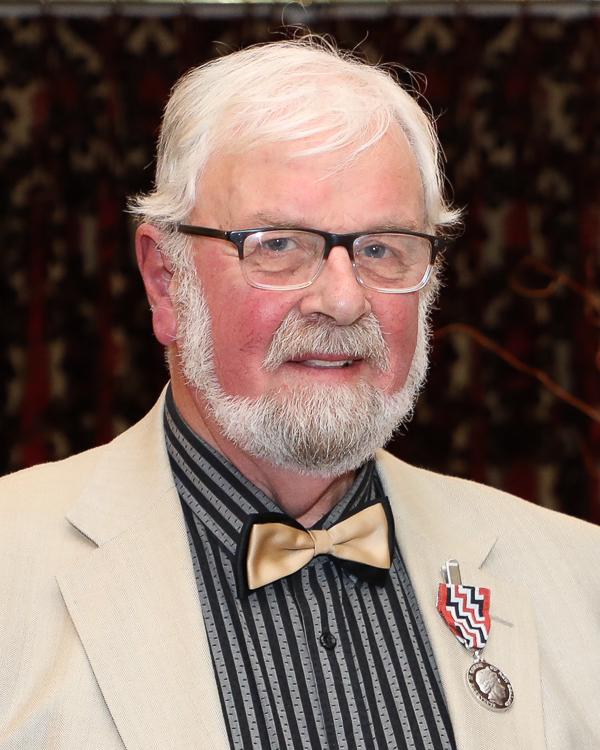
Graeme Rice

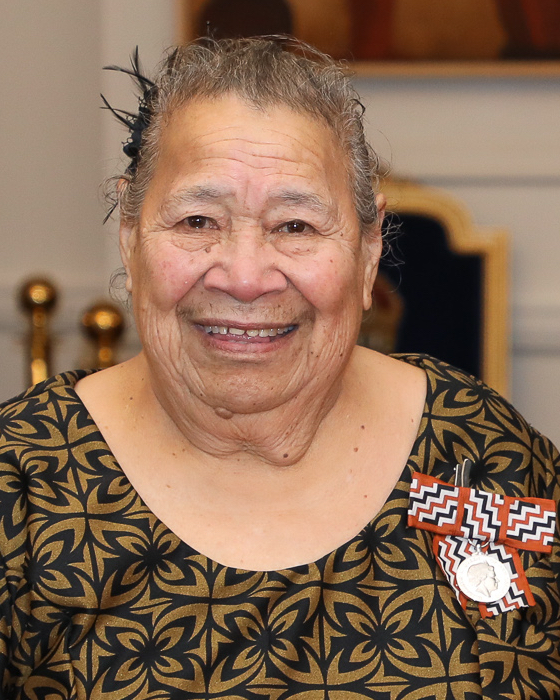
Vaipou Saluni

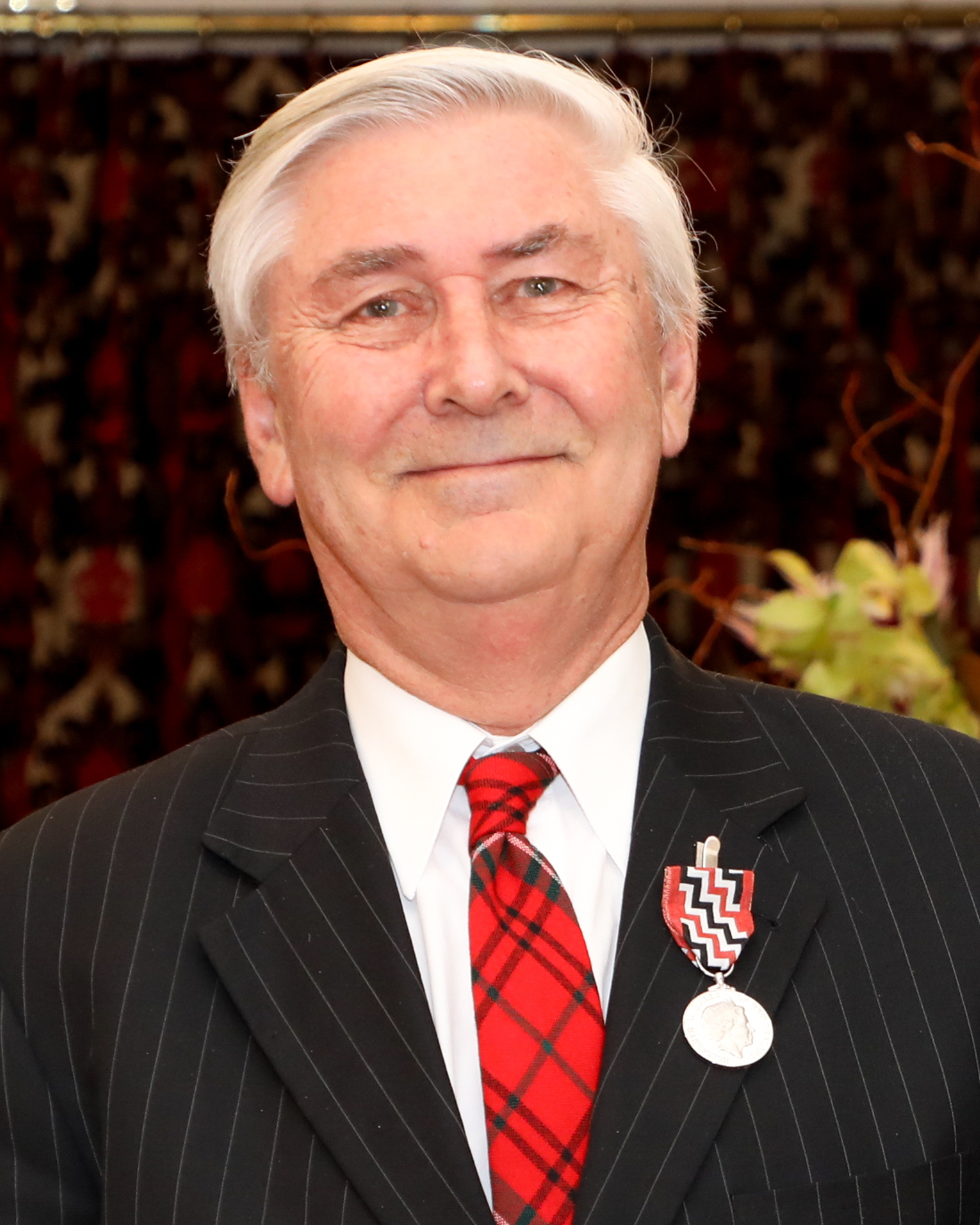
Michael Scrivener

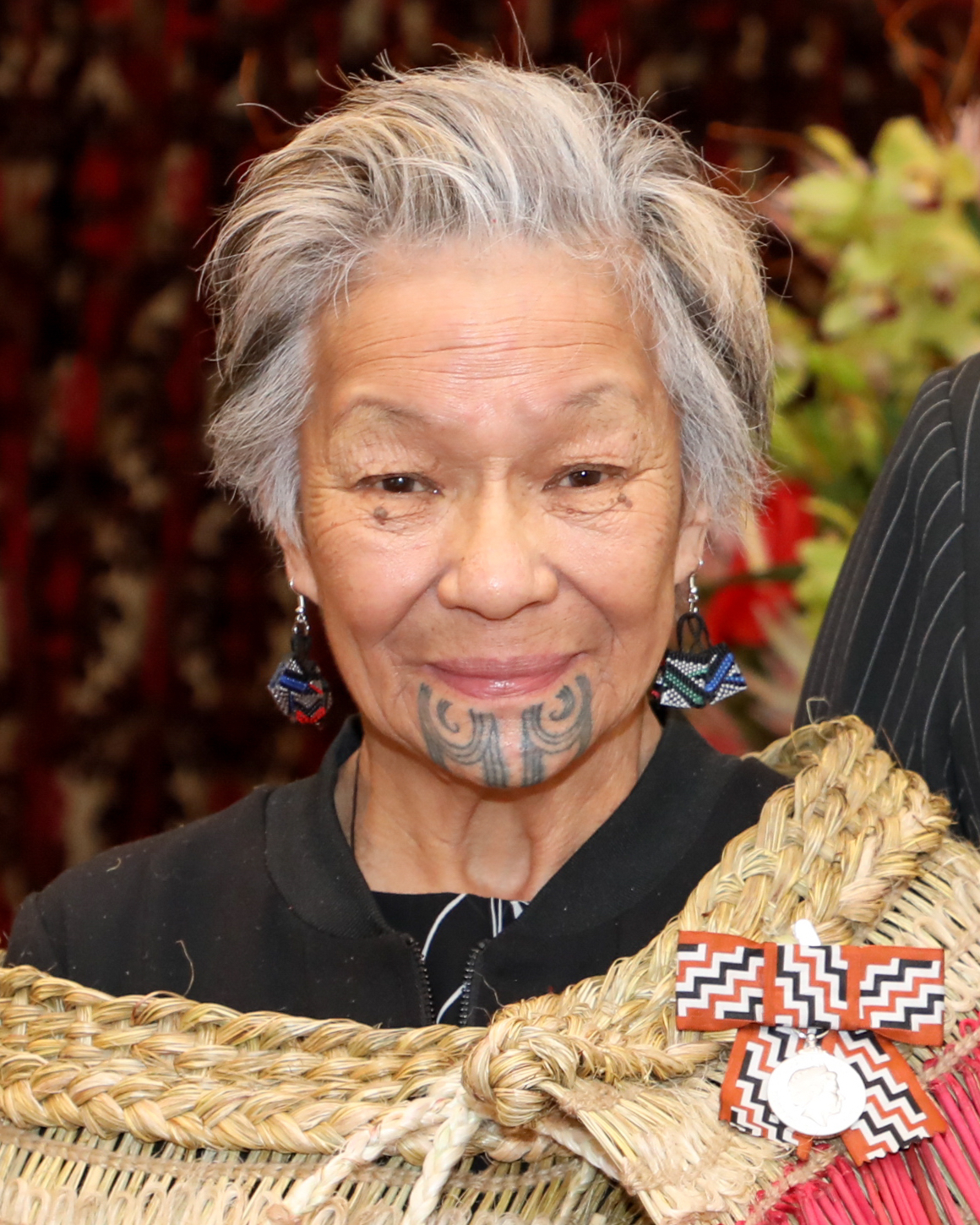
Wini Solomon

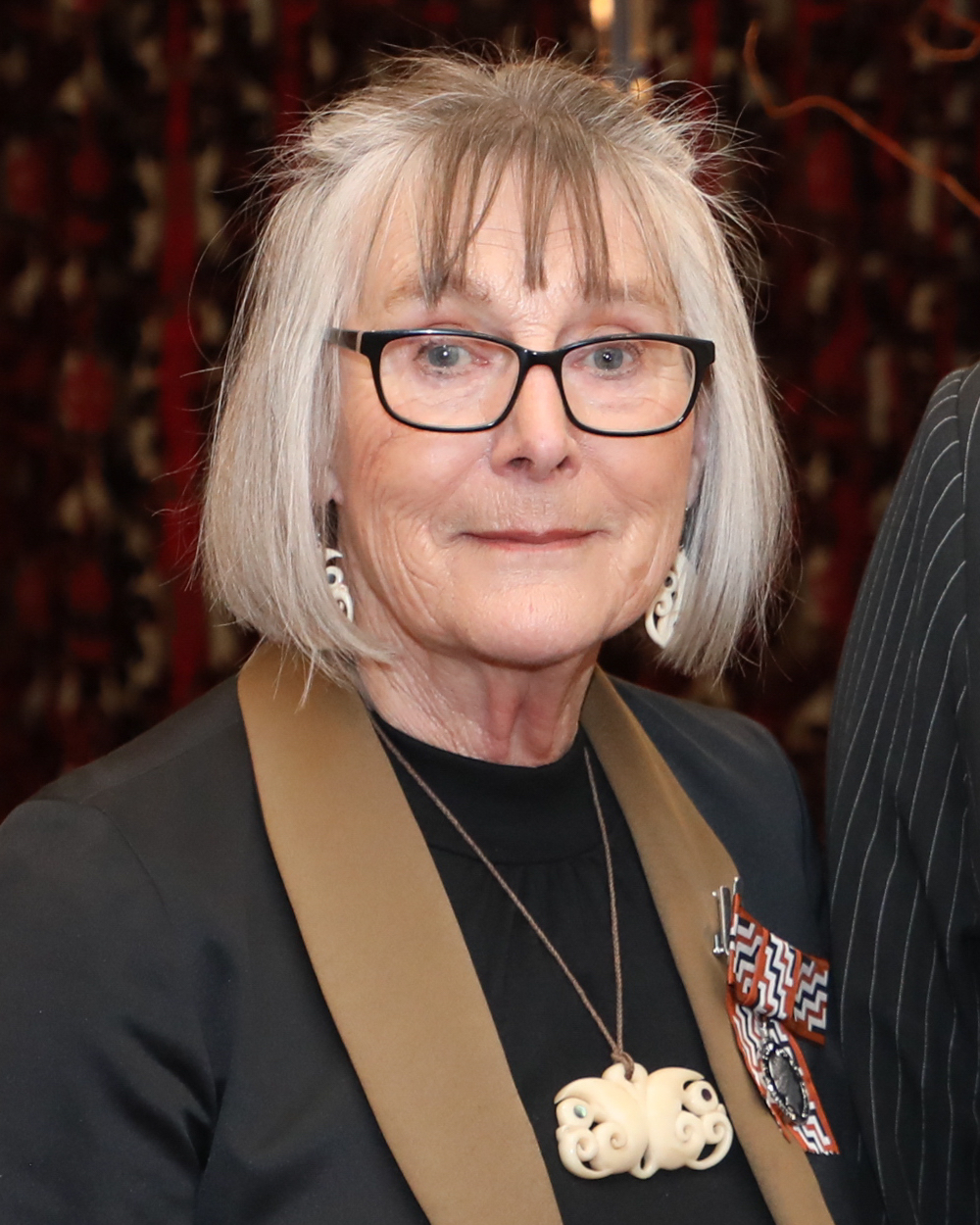
Ann Somerville

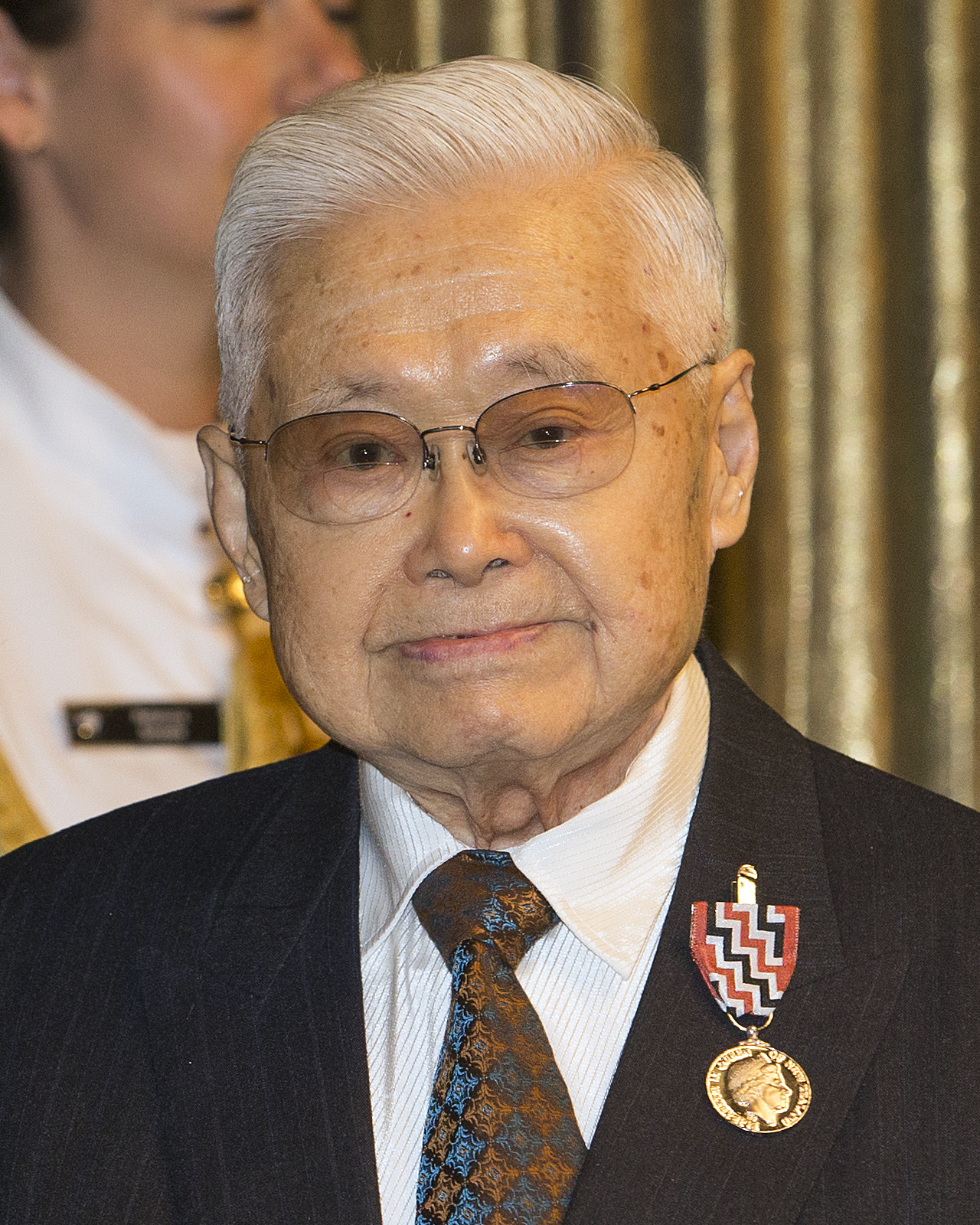
Yu-Shiun Tang

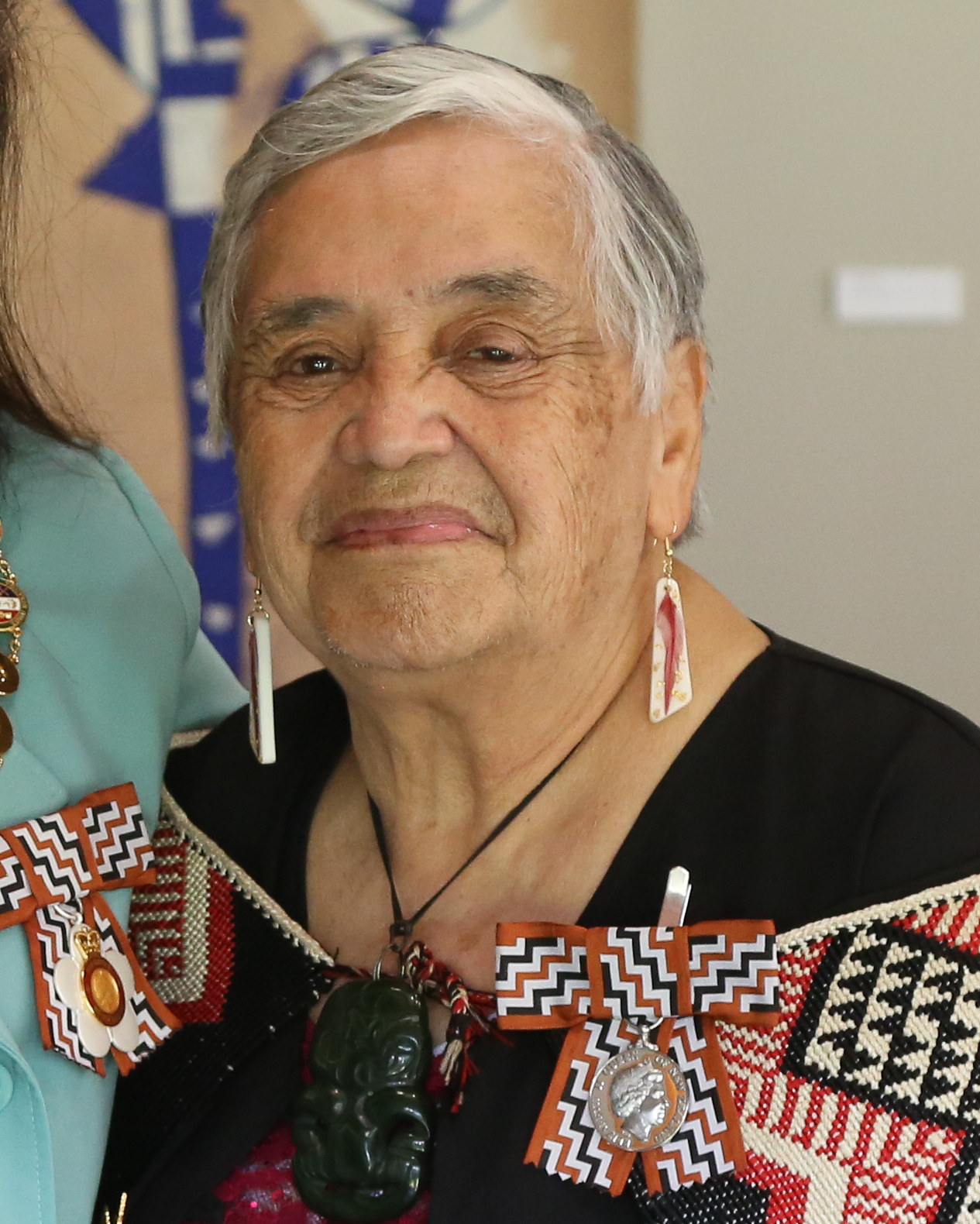
Mihi Te Huia

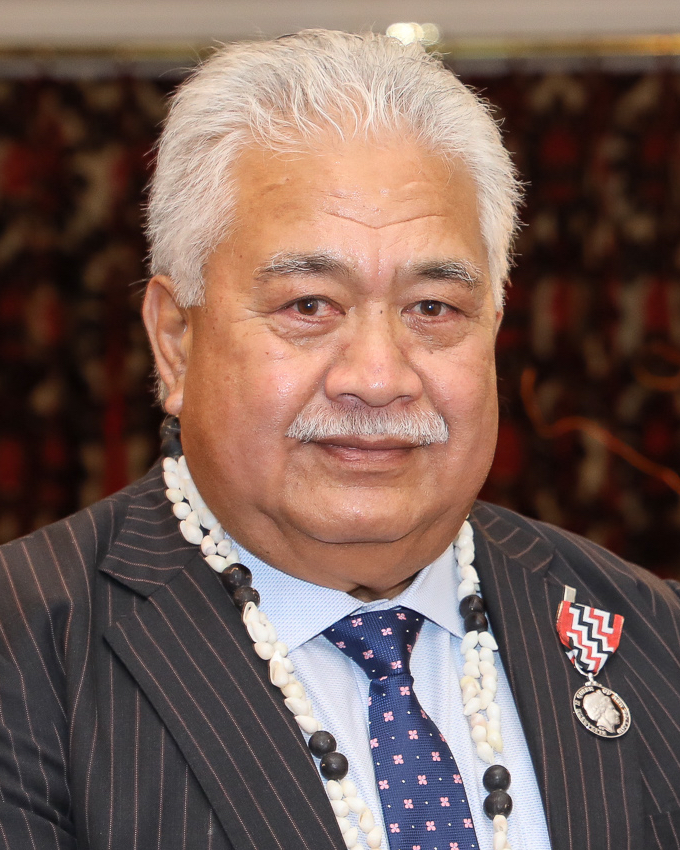
Luther Toloa

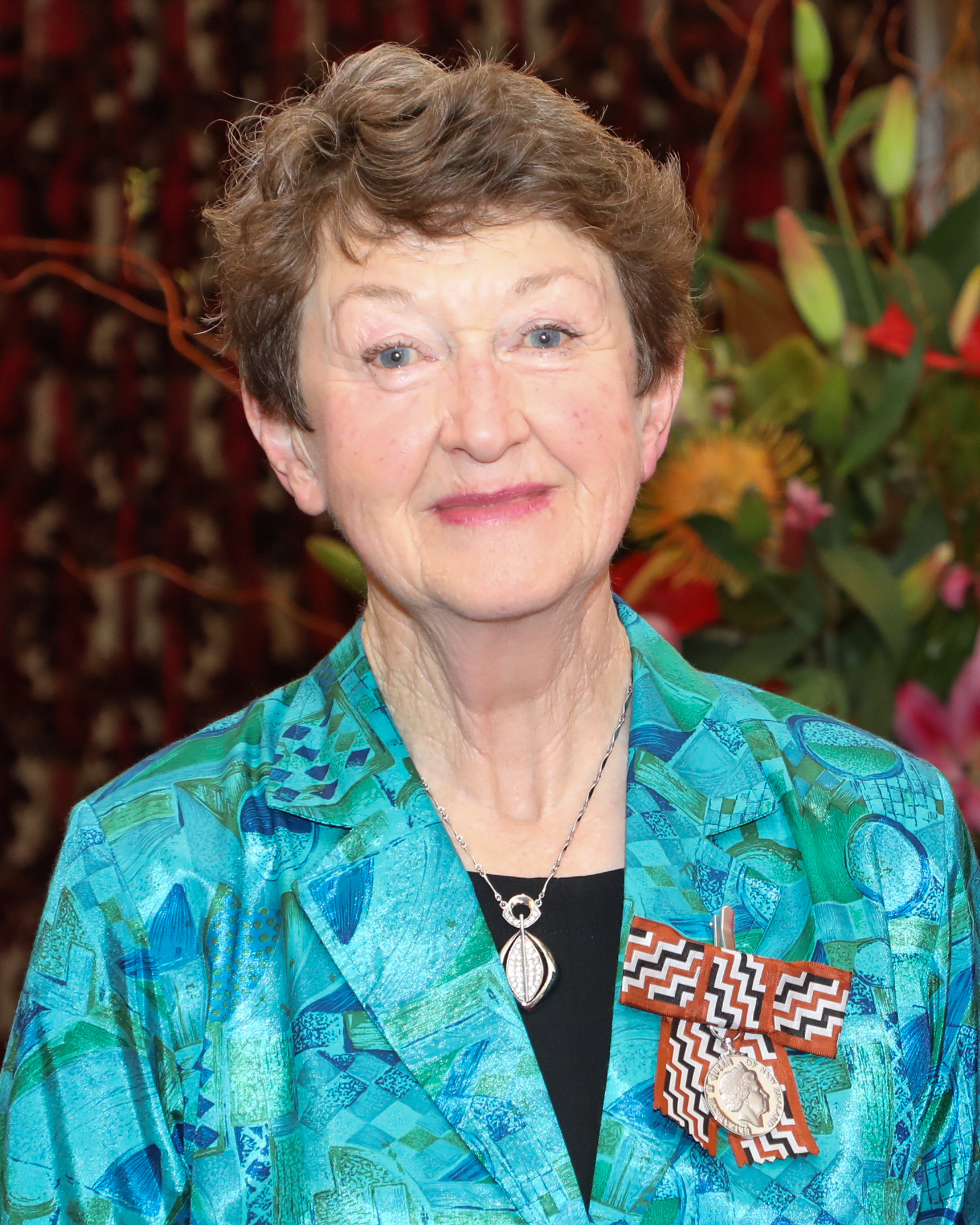
Wendy van Delden

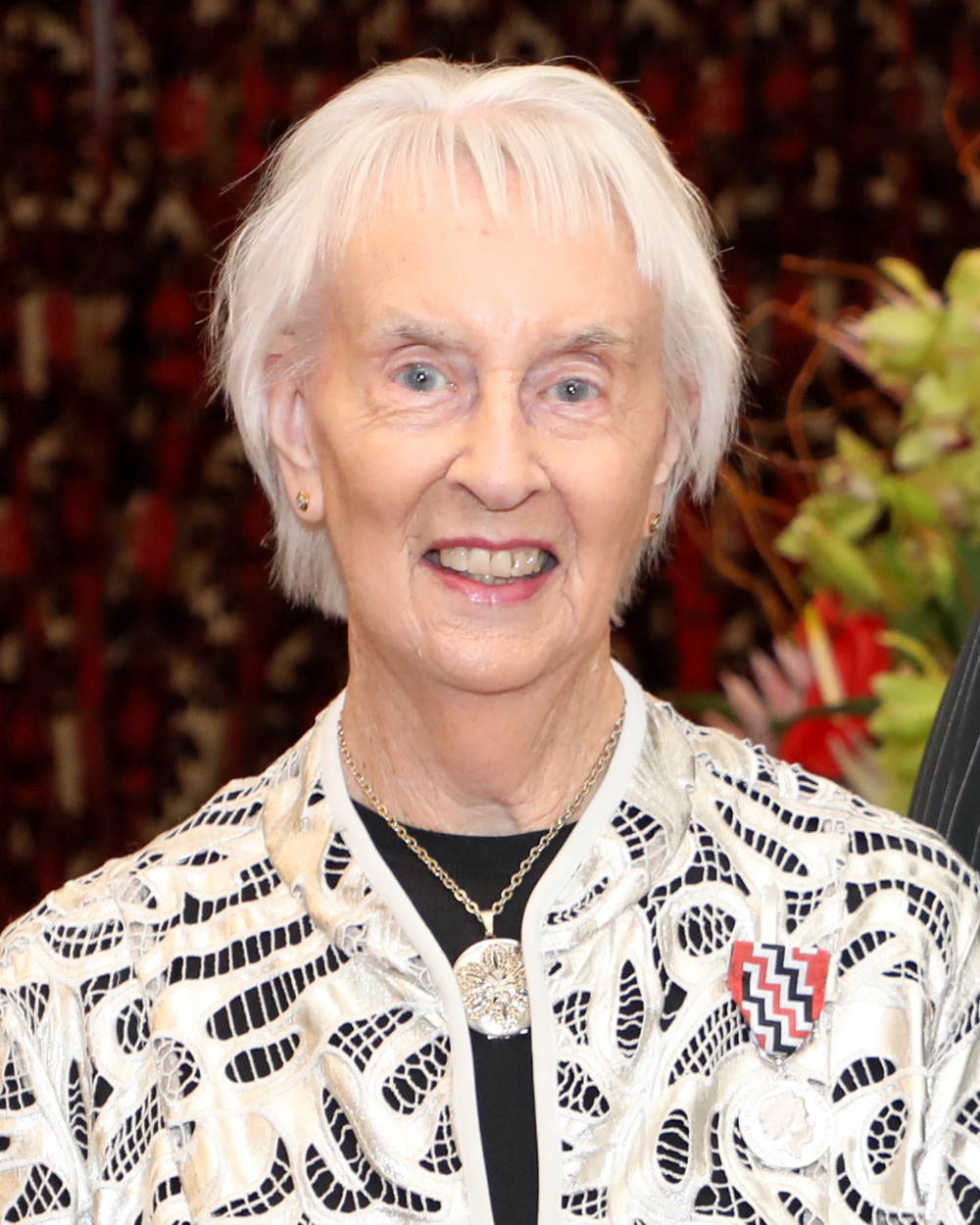
Heather Waldron

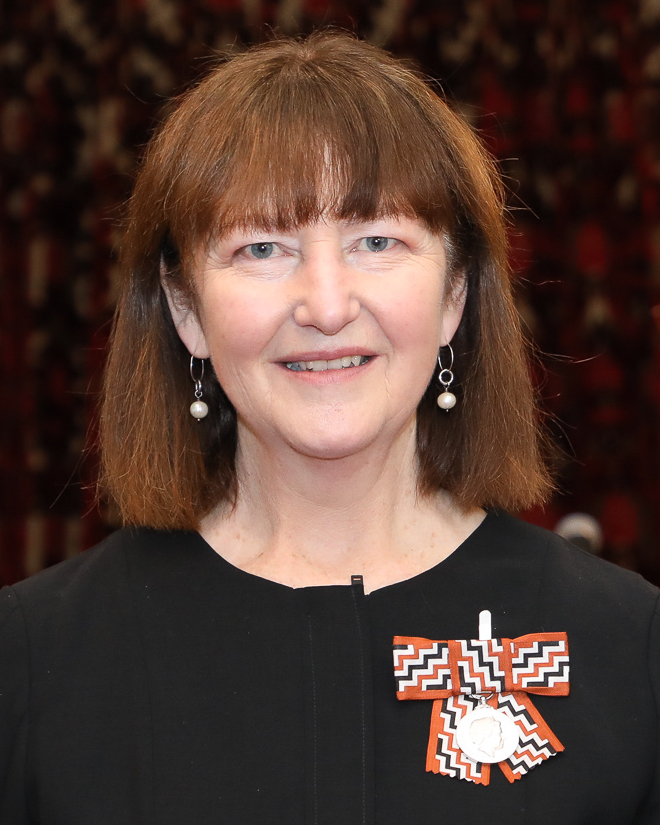
Lynda Wallace

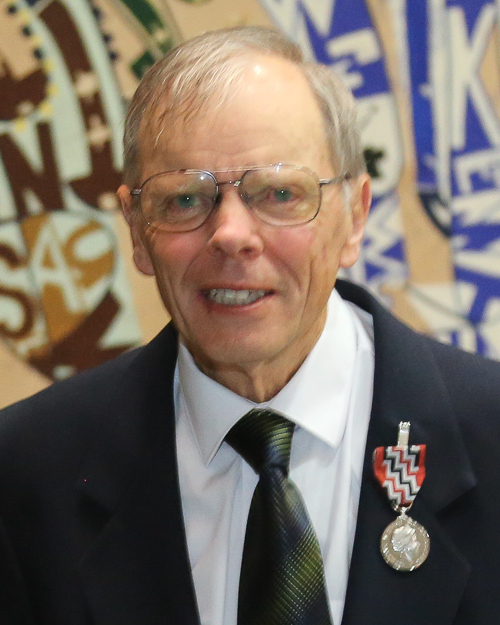
Ian Wilson

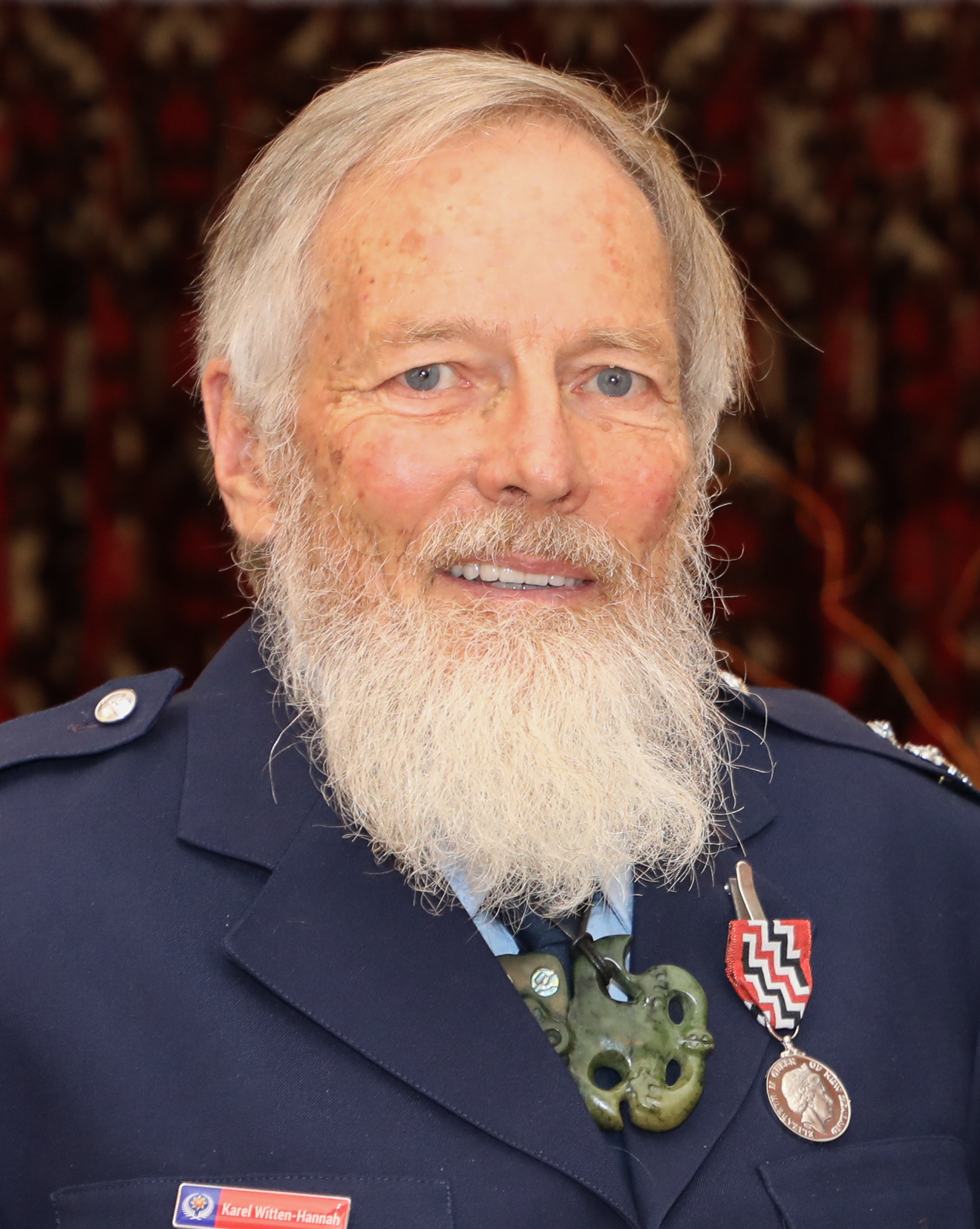
Karel Witten‑Hannah

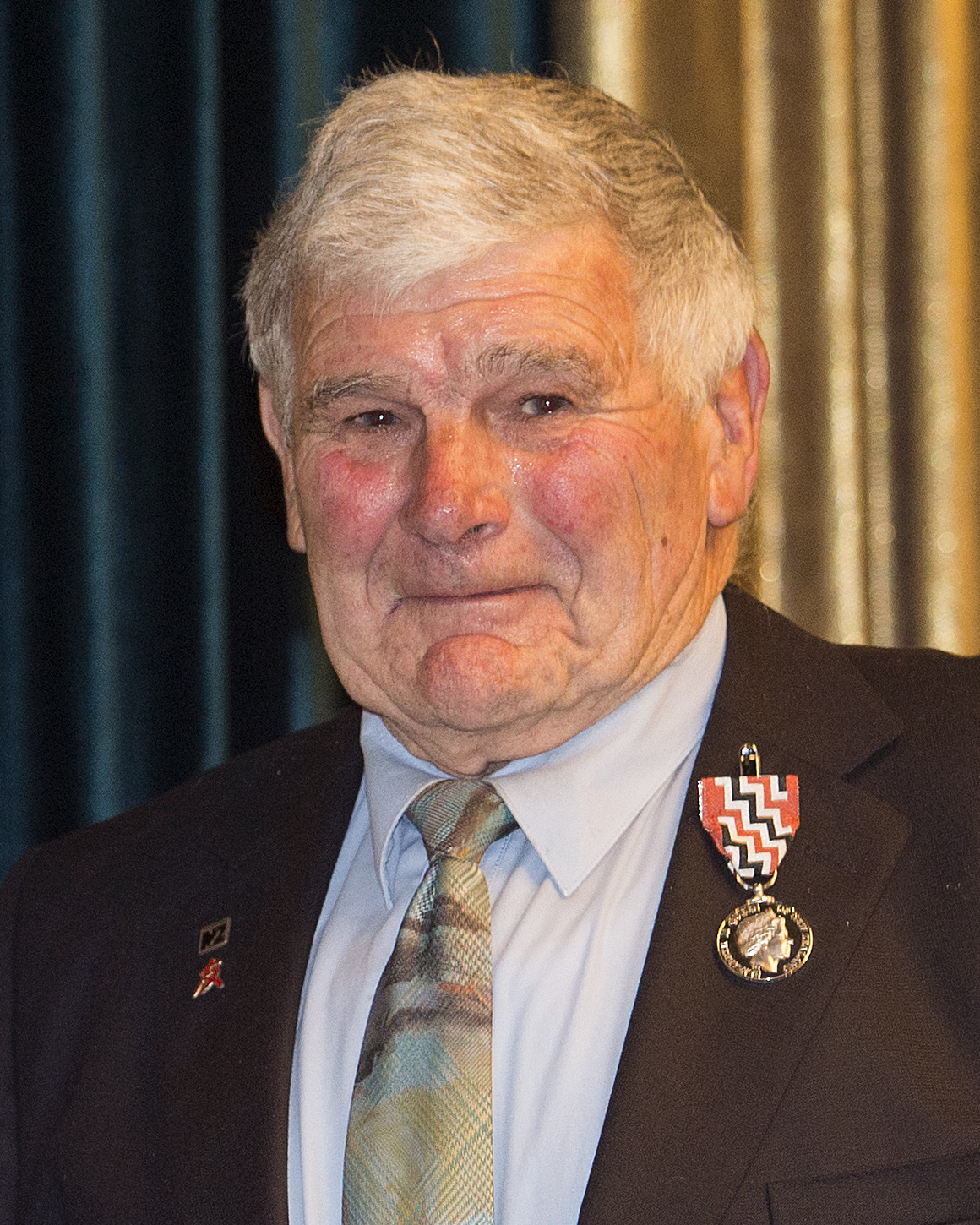
Bill Woods

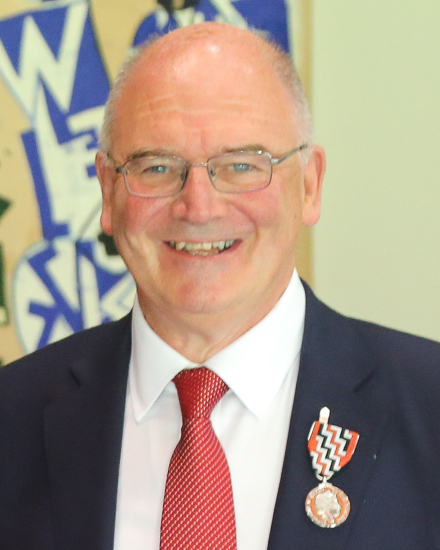
John Wyatt

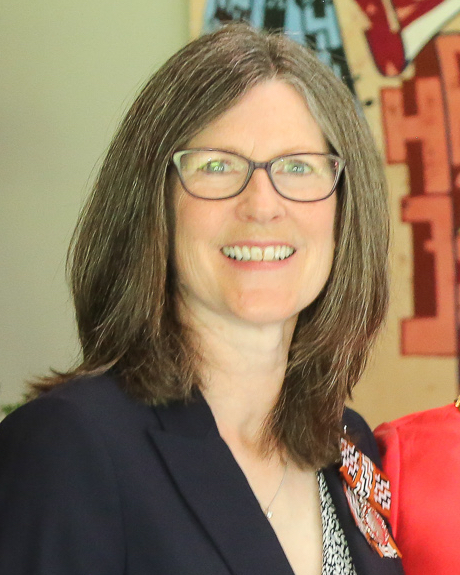
Sandra Wyatt

== New Zealand Antarctic Medal (NZAM) ==
- Dr Ian Hawes – of Otūmoetai. For services to Antarctic science and conservation.
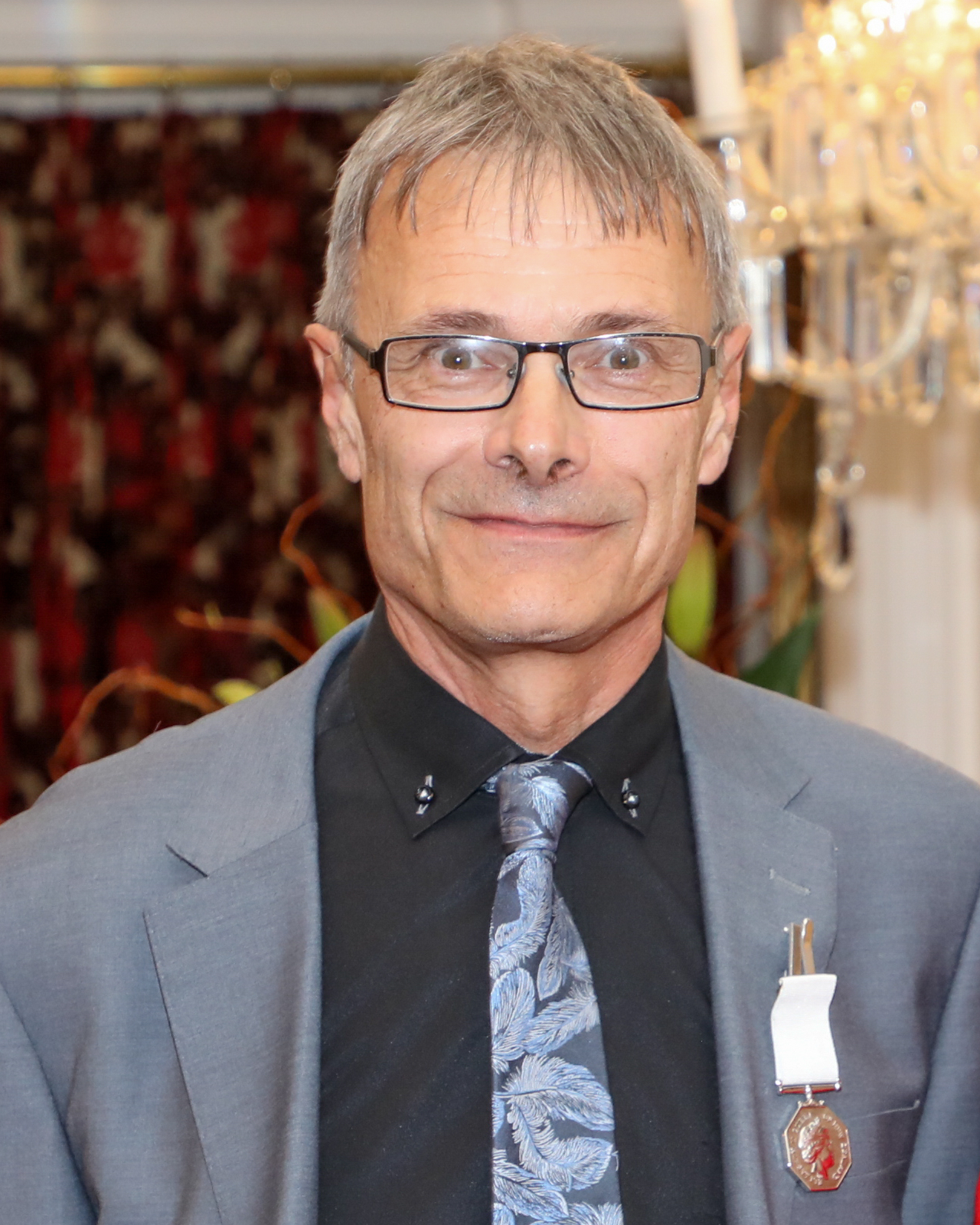
Ian Hawes
