= 2020 in New Zealand =

- Decades: 2000s; 2010s; 2020s
- See also: History of New Zealand; List of years in New Zealand; Timeline of New Zealand history

The following lists events that happened during 2020 in New Zealand. One overarching event was the COVID-19 pandemic.

== Incumbents ==
=== Regal and vice-regal ===
- Head of State – Elizabeth II
- Governor-General – Patsy Reddy
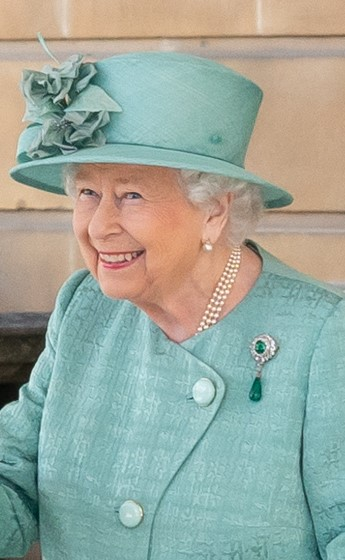
Elizabeth II

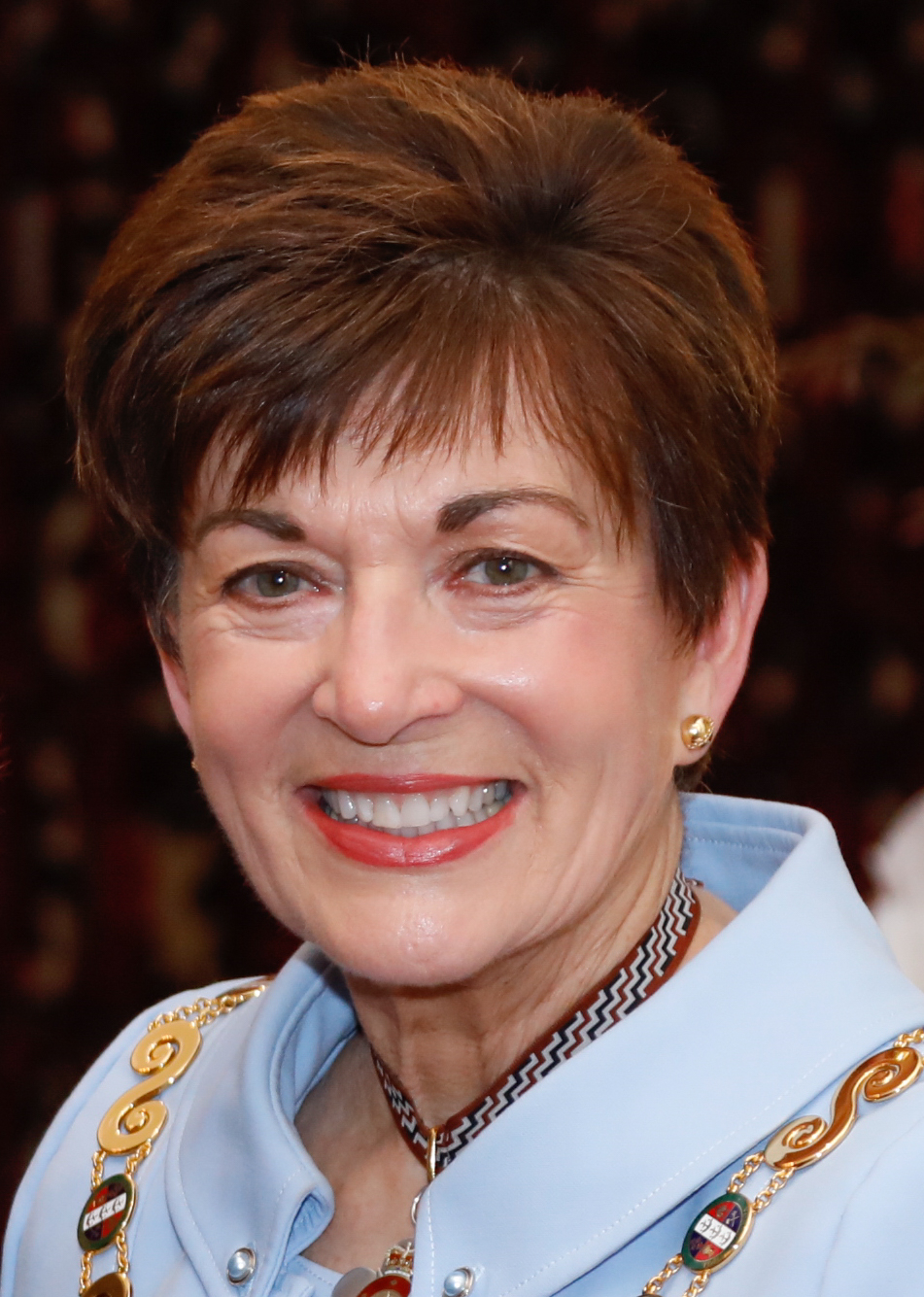
Patsy Reddy

=== Government ===
Legislature term: 52nd New Zealand Parliament and from 25 November, 53rd New Zealand Parliament.

The Sixth Labour Government, elected in 2017 and October 2020, continues.

- Speaker of the House – Trevor Mallard
- Prime Minister – Jacinda Ardern
- Deputy Prime Minister – Winston Peters until 6 November, then Grant Robertson
- Leader of the House – Chris Hipkins
- Minister of Finance – Grant Robertson
- Minister of Foreign Affairs – Winston Peters until 6 November, then Nanaia Mahuta
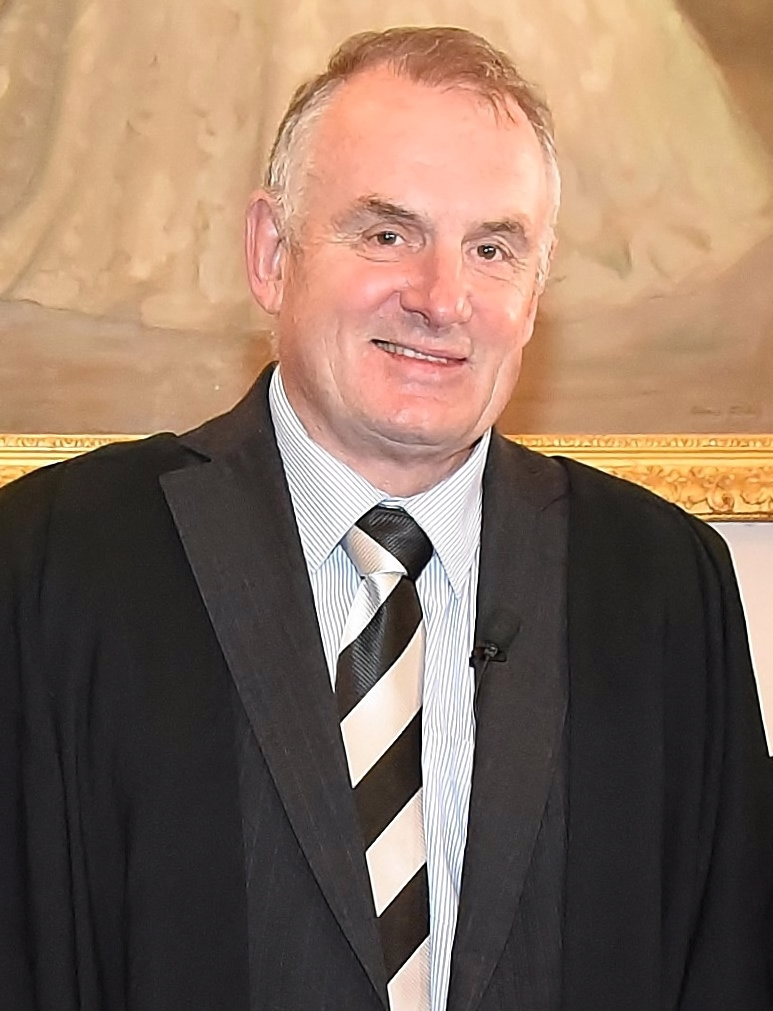
Trevor Mallard

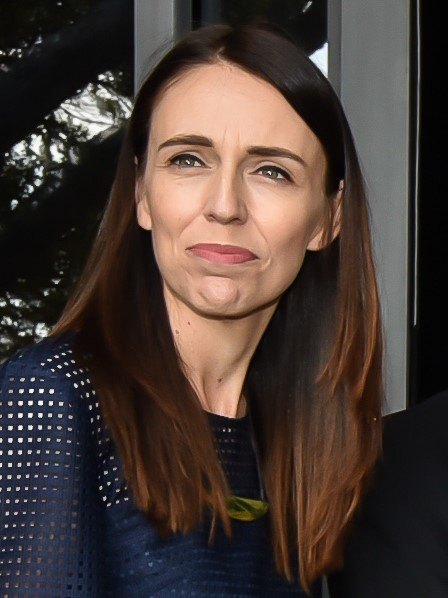
Jacinda Ardern

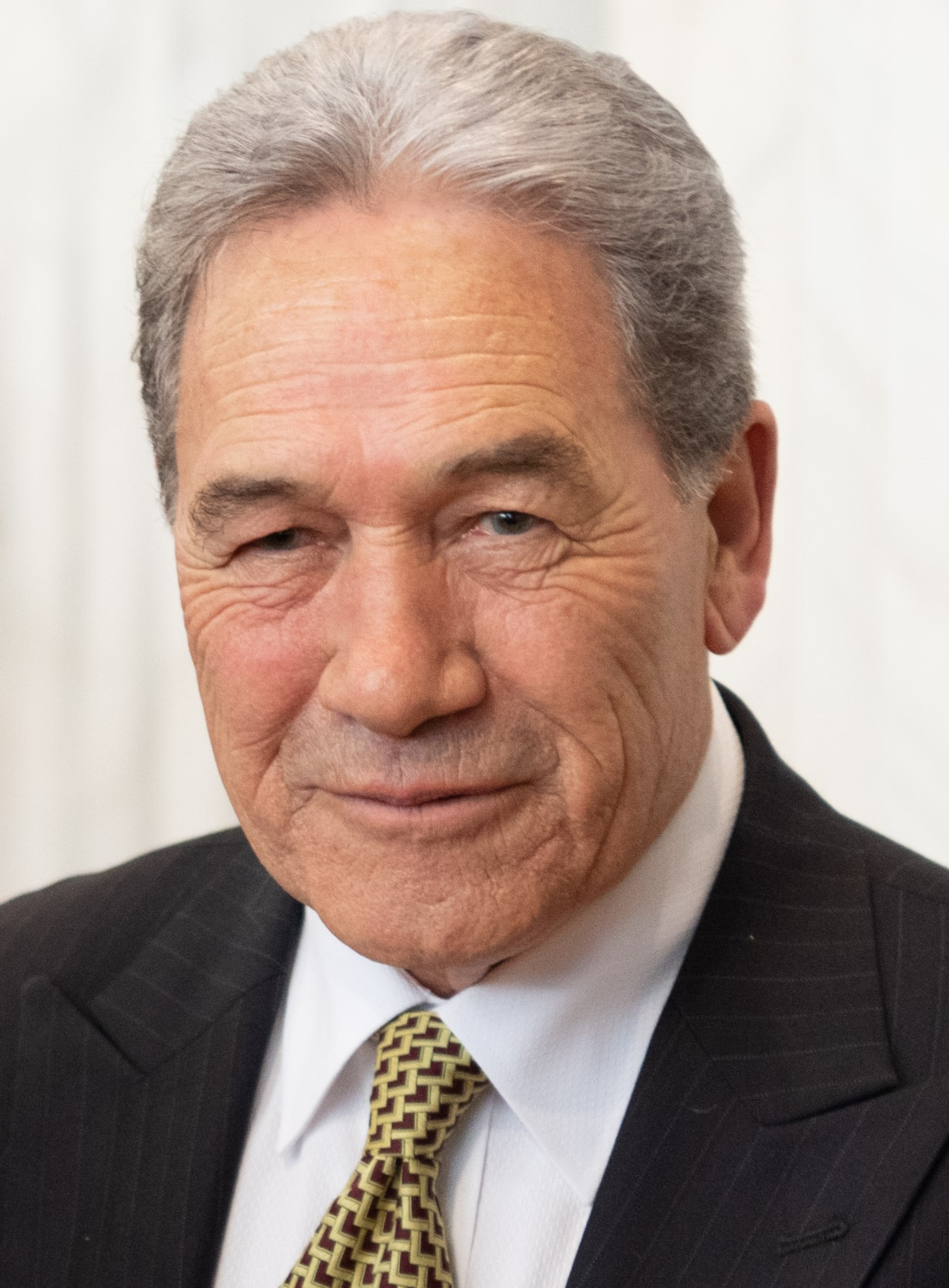
Winston Peters

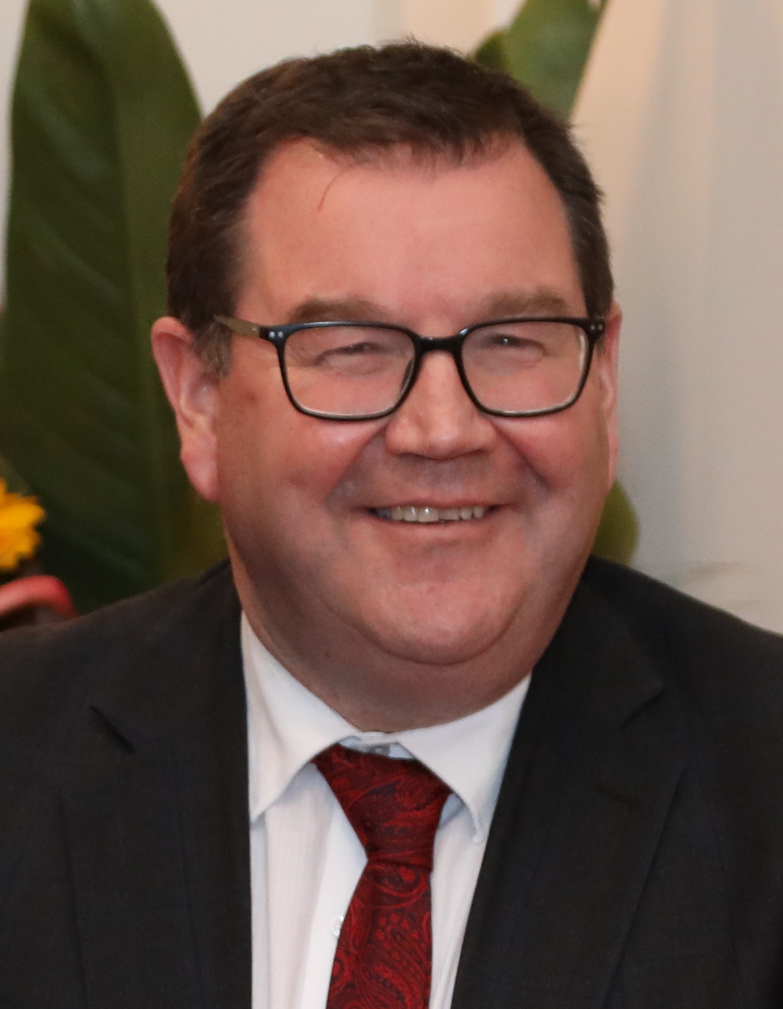
Grant Robertson

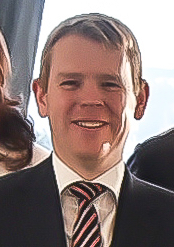
Chris Hipkins

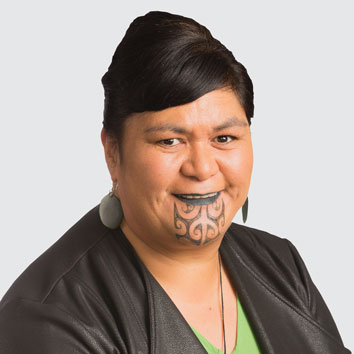
Nanaia Mahuta

=== Other party leaders in parliament ===
- National – Simon Bridges until 22 May, then Todd Muller until 14 July, and then Judith Collins (Leader of the Opposition)
- New Zealand First – Winston Peters until 17 October
- Green – James Shaw and Marama Davidson
- ACT – David Seymour
- Māori Party – Rawiri Waititi and Debbie Ngarewa-Packer from 17 October
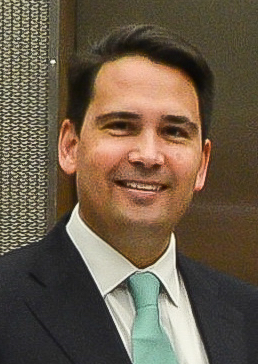
Simon Bridges

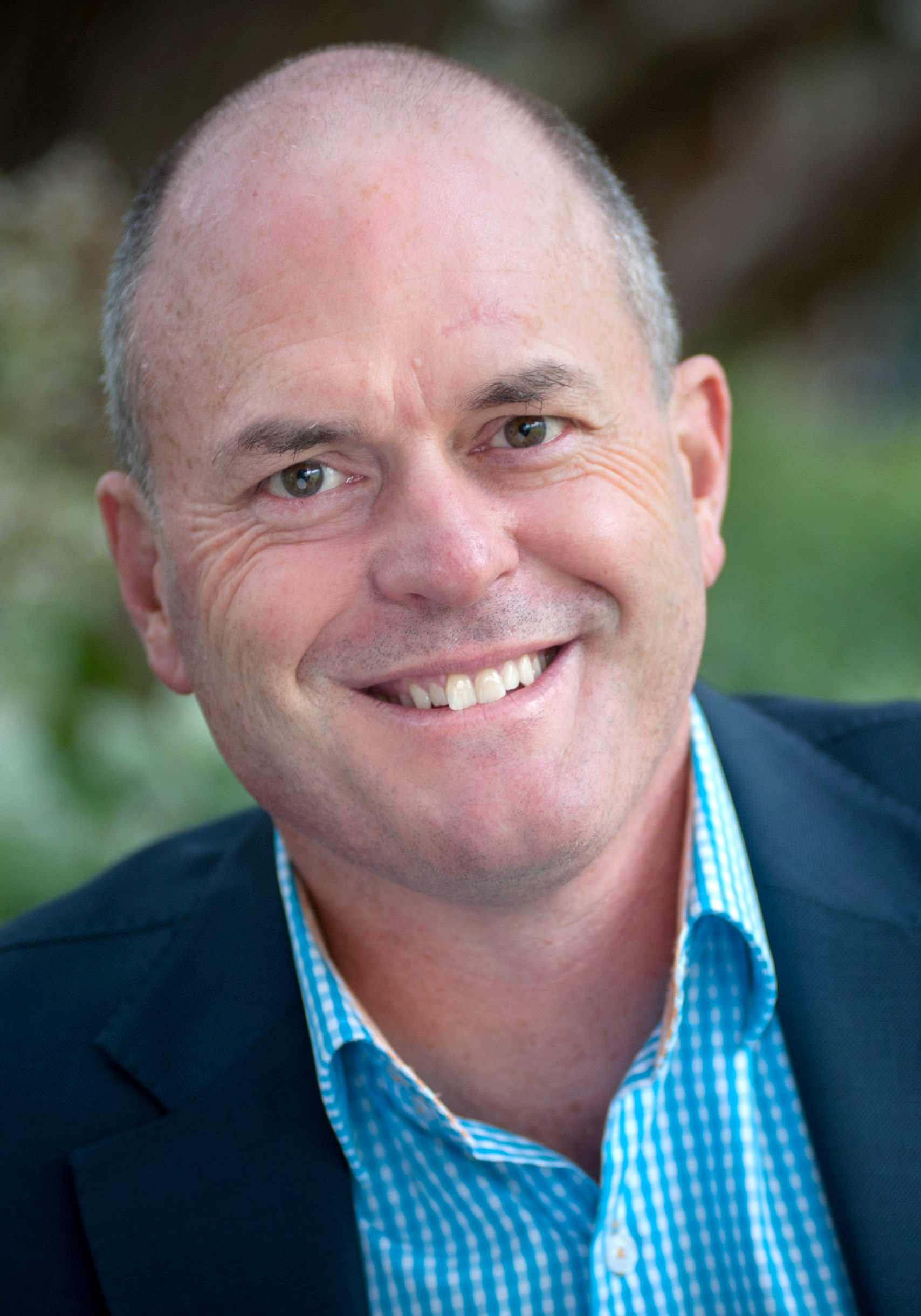
Todd Muller

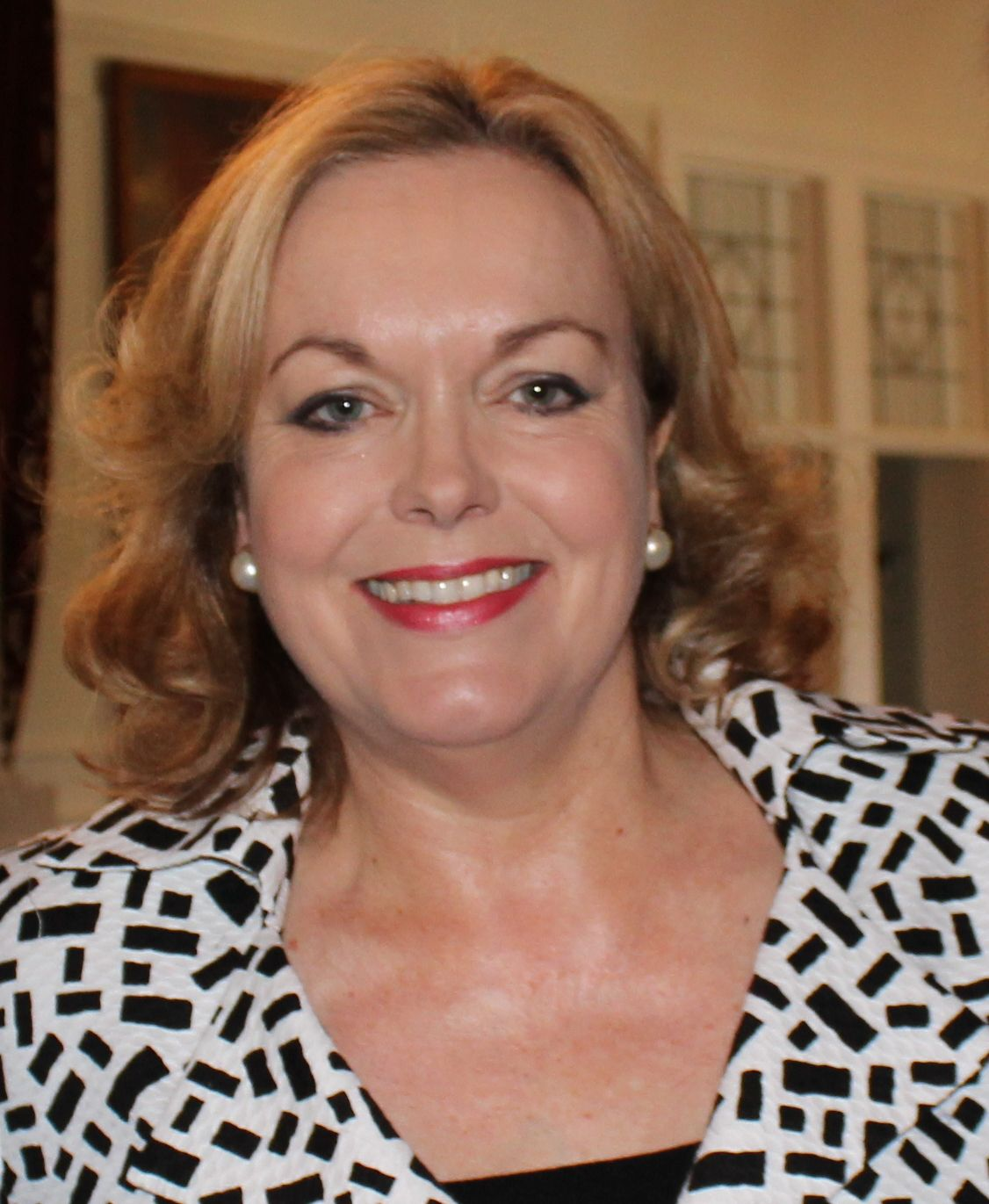
Judith Collins

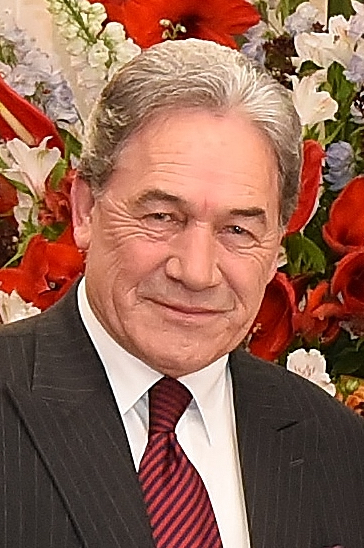
Winston Peters

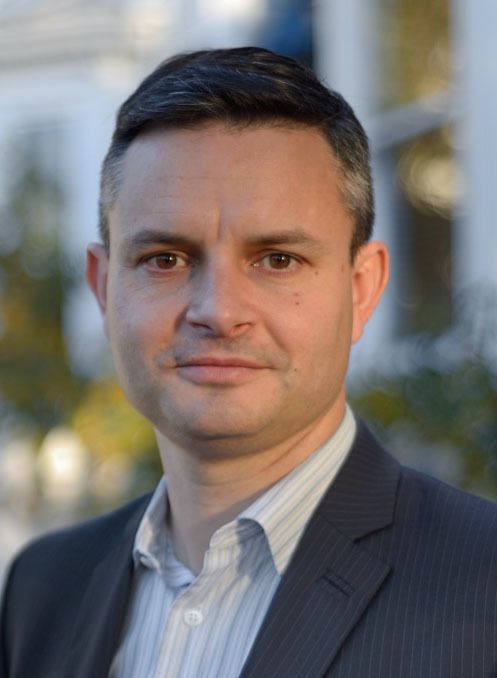
James Shaw

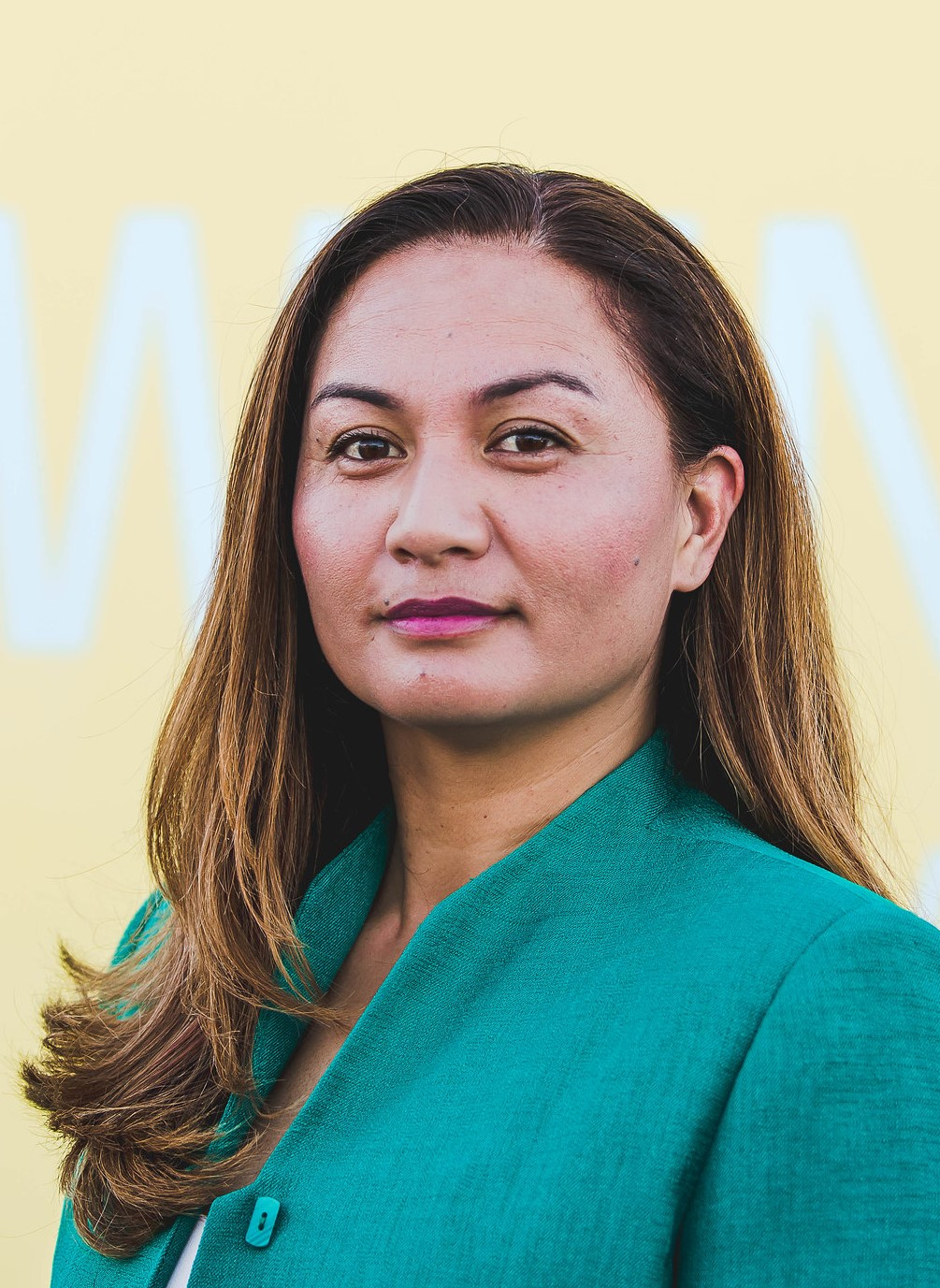
Marama Davidson

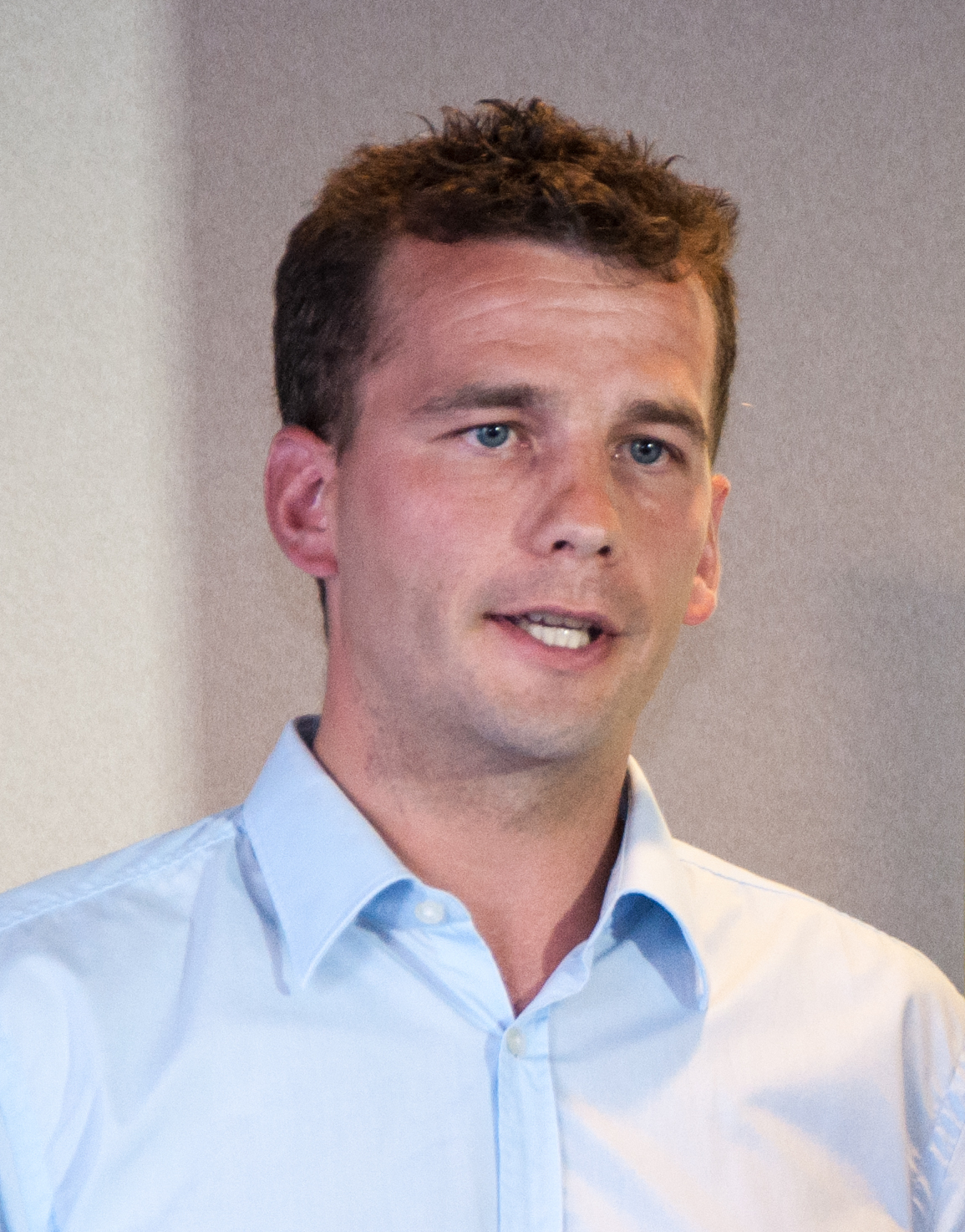
David Seymour

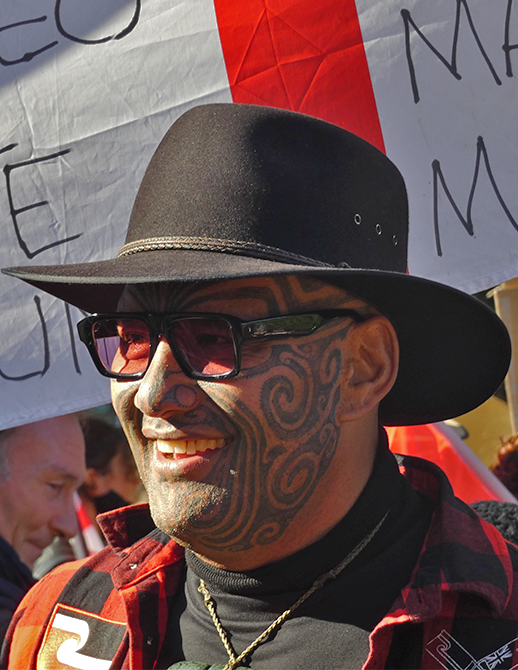
Rawiri Waititi

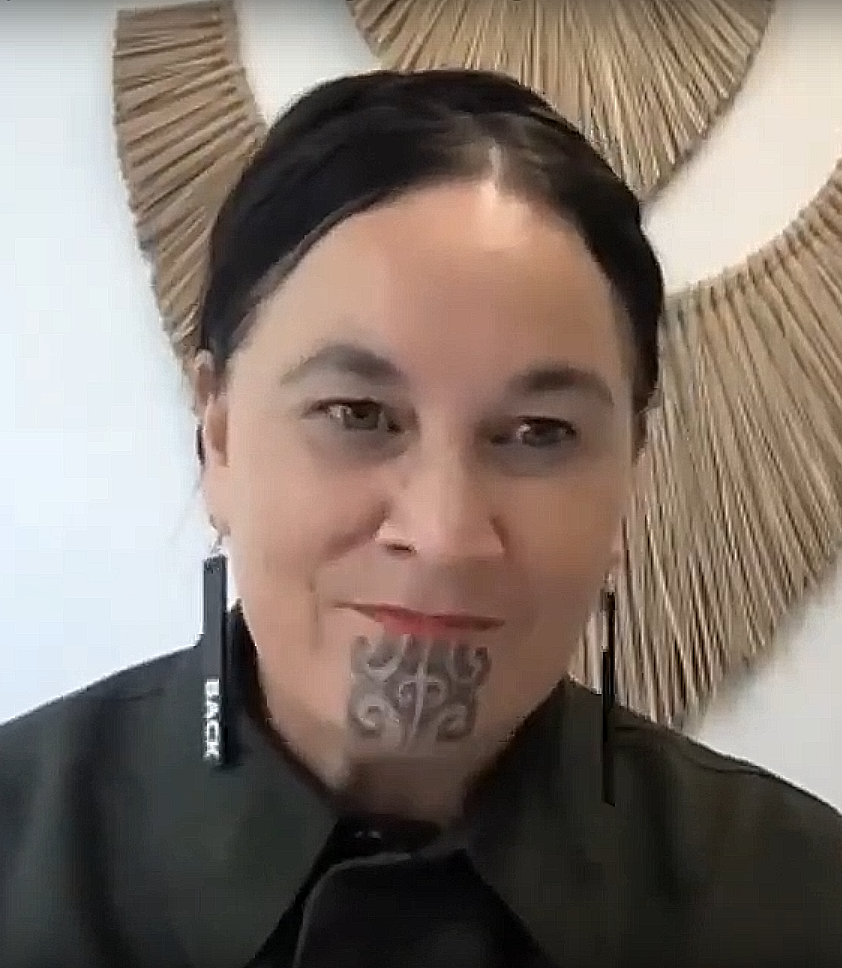
Debbie Ngarewa-Packer

=== Judiciary ===
- Chief Justice – Helen Winkelmann
- President of the Court of Appeal – Stephen Kós
- Chief High Court judge – Geoffrey Venning until 31 May, then Susan Thomas
- Chief District Court judge – Heemi Taumaunu
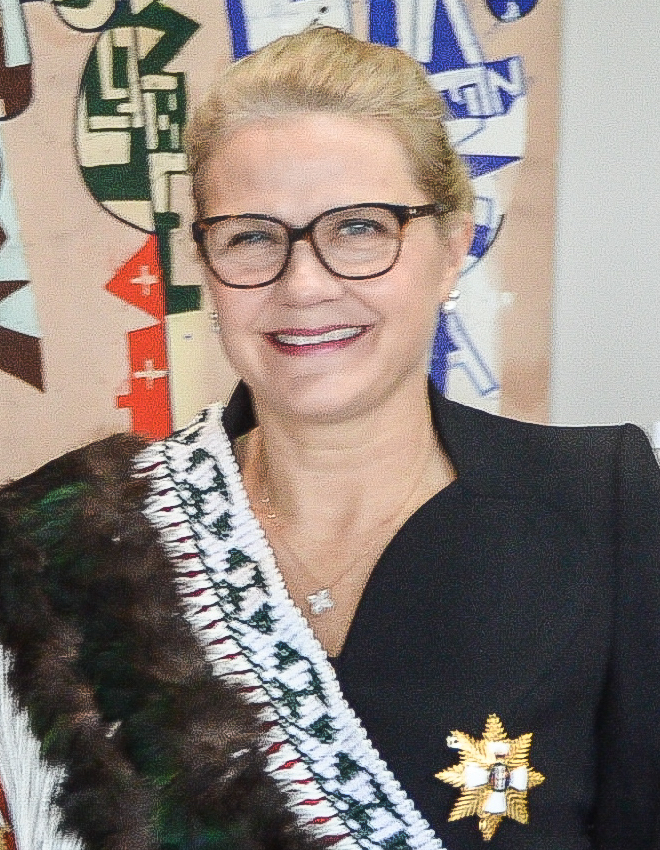
Helen Winkelmann

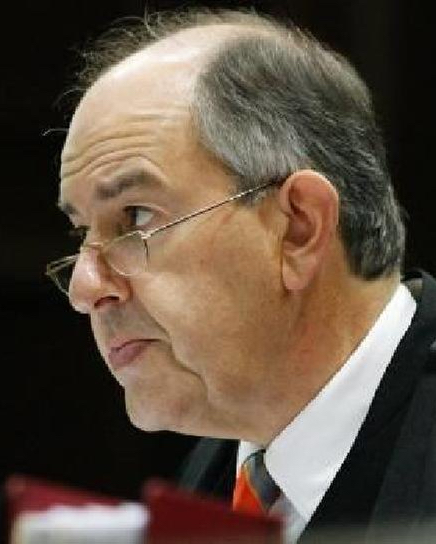
Stephen Kós

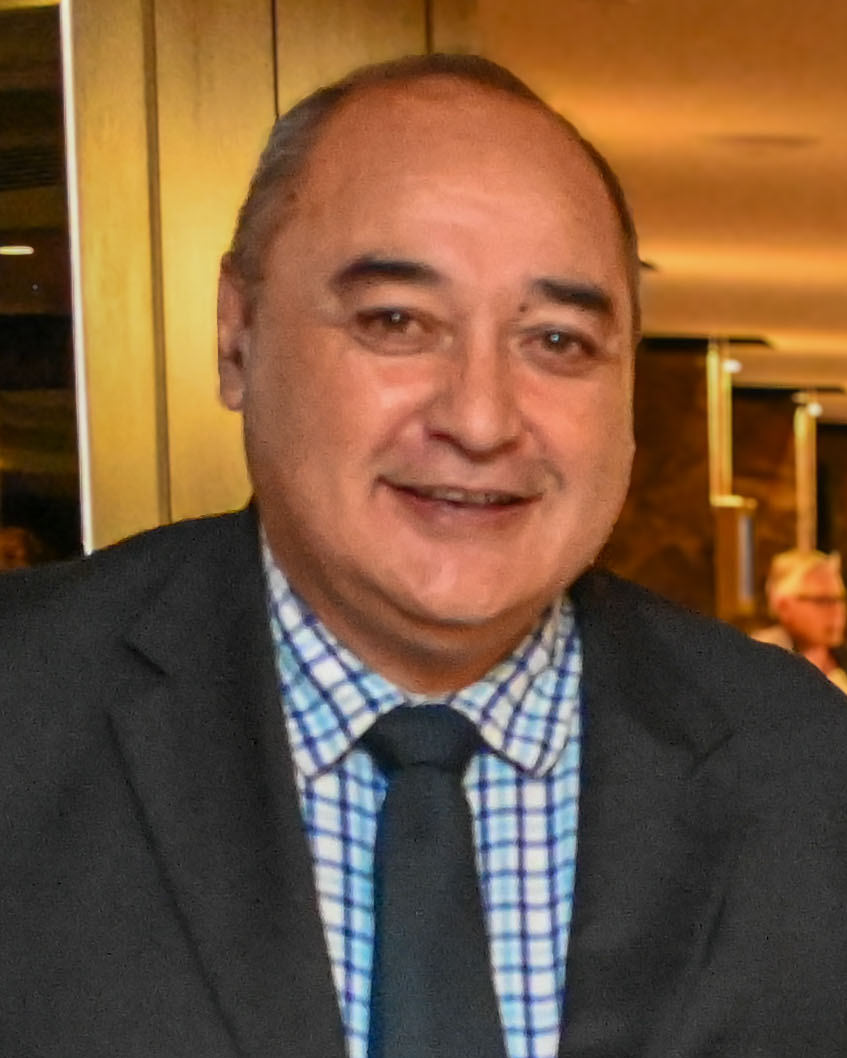
Heemi Taumaunu

=== Main centre leaders ===
- Mayor of Auckland – Phil Goff
- Mayor of Tauranga – Tenby Powell until 20 November, and then Tina Salisbury (acting mayor)
- Mayor of Hamilton – Paula Southgate
- Mayor of Wellington – Andy Foster
- Mayor of Christchurch – Lianne Dalziel
- Mayor of Dunedin – Aaron Hawkins
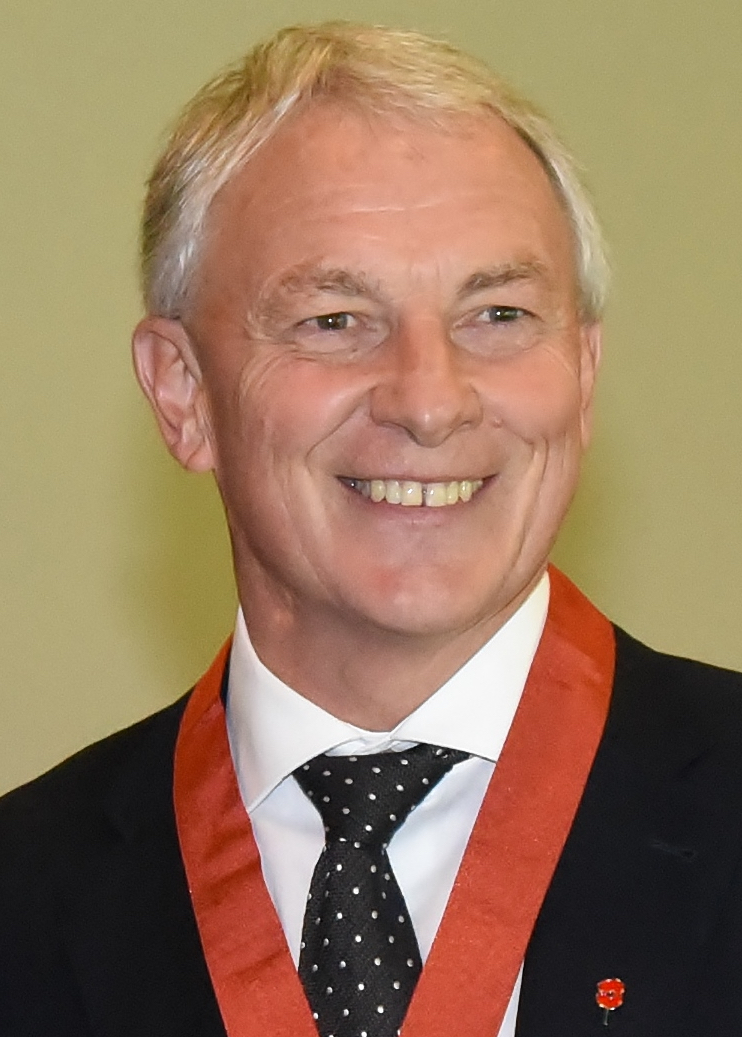
Phil Goff

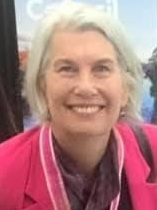
Paula Southgate

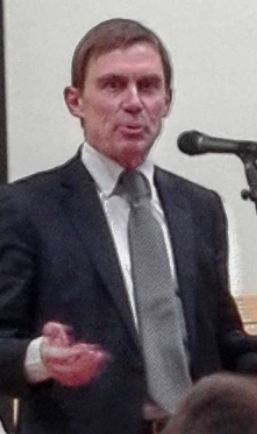
Andy Foster

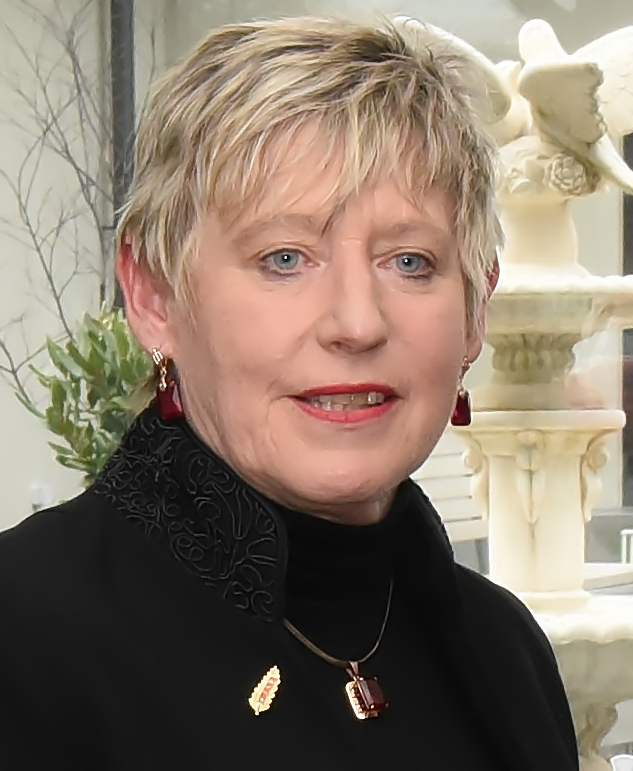
Lianne Dalziell

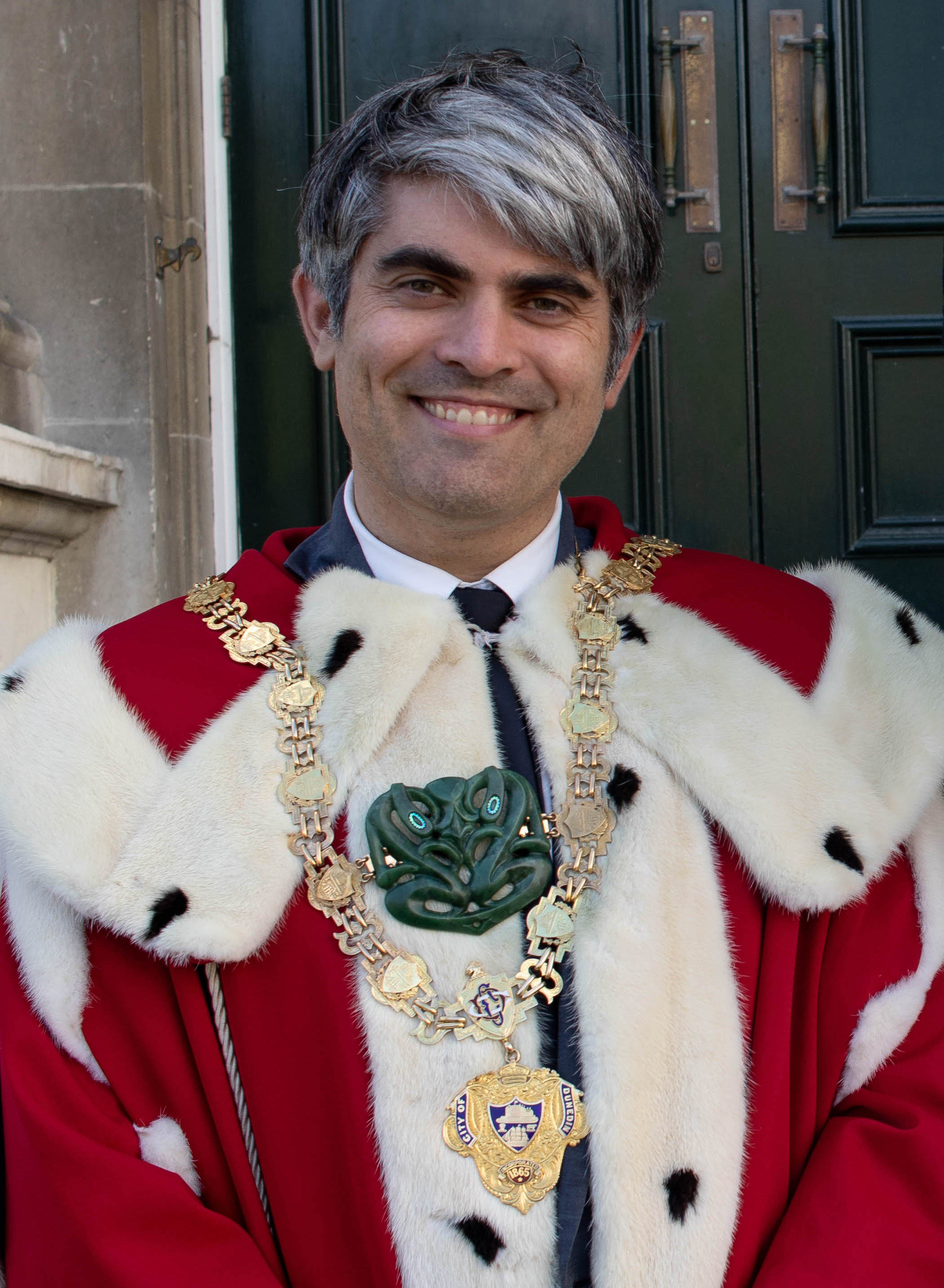
Aaron Hawkins

== Events ==
=== January ===
- 28 January – Jacinda Ardern announces the general election date to be 19 September.
- 29 January – The New Zealand Upgrade Programme is announced.

=== February ===
- 3 February – A state of emergency is declared in Milford Sound as rain and flooding hit the region.
- 5 February – Residents of Gore, Mataura and Wyndham are ordered to evacuate as the Mataura River bursts its banks.
- 28 February
  - COVID-19 in New Zealand: New Zealand's first case of the coronavirus is confirmed. They had recently returned from Iran via Bali.
  - Kiwibank stops issuing and accepting cheques as payment, becoming the first New Zealand bank to do so.

=== March ===
- 5 March – COVID-19 in New Zealand: Information of the first human transmission case of the coronavirus within New Zealand is released.
- 14 March – COVID-19 in New Zealand: Jacinda Ardern announces new measures to stop the spread of the coronavirus. These measures provide that all people (excluding people who have come from Pacific islands where no cases have been confirmed) who arrive in New Zealand must self-isolate for 14 days. Cruise ships are also banned from docking in New Zealand ports.
- 17 March – COVID-19 in New Zealand: A $12.1 billion scheme is announced by the government, due to the economic impact of coronavirus on New Zealand, including $5.1 billion for an income subsidy. This is the biggest peacetime government spend in history.
- 18 March - The New Zealand Parliament passes legislation decriminalising abortion.
- 19 March – COVID-19 in New Zealand: The Royal New Zealand Returned and Services' Association announces that all Anzac Day services, scheduled for 25 April, will be cancelled and the red poppy collection postponed due to the health risk. This is the first time that Anzac Day services have not been held since 1916.
- 21 March – COVID-19 in New Zealand: Ardern announces the COVID-19 alert level system, with New Zealand initially being placed at alert level 2.
- 23 March – COVID-19 in New Zealand: New Zealand is placed at alert level 3.
- 25 March
  - COVID-19 in New Zealand: A State of National Emergency is declared in response to the COVID-19 pandemic.
  - COVID-19 in New Zealand: New Zealand is upgraded to alert level 4 at 11:59 pm, and the country enters lockdown for a period of at least four weeks.
- 26 March – The perpetrator of the 2019 Christchurch mosque shootings pleads guilty to all 51 murder charges, as well as 40 charges of attempted murder and one charge of engaging in a terrorist act laid under the Terrorism Suppression Act 2002.
- 29 March – COVID-19 in New Zealand: The first coronavirus-related death in New Zealand occurs, a woman in her 70s from Greymouth.

=== April ===
- 6 April – COVID-19 in New Zealand: Queen Elizabeth II makes a rare broadcast to the nation and the Commonwealth regarding the COVID-19 pandemic, her fifth televised broadcast outside of her Christmas Message.
- 8 April – Dunedin's Baldwin Street reclaims its title as the steepest residential street in the world after Ffordd Pen Llech in Harlech, Wales, took the title in July 2019.
- 25 April:
  - COVID-19 in New Zealand: New Zealanders paid tribute at private dawn services as public remembrance services are cancelled, the first time since 1916.
  - Central government announces $40 million funding for mental health service, giving 1.5 million New Zealanders free access to the service, once fully operational.
- 27 April – COVID-19 in New Zealand: New Zealand enters alert level 3 for a period of at least two weeks at 11:59 pm, partially lifting the lockdown requirements.

=== May ===
- 11 May – COVID-19 in New Zealand: Cabinet decides to lower New Zealand's COVID-19 alert level to level two, effective from the 14 May.
- 13 May:
  - COVID-19 in New Zealand: New Zealand entered COVID-19 alert level two at 11.59pm.
  - It is reported that New Zealand Police failed to receive clearance from higher officials in central government, the senior police hierarchy or the Privacy Commissioner to use facial recognition software, after a trial was tested using the American firm Clearview AI's system.
- 14 May – The 2020 Budget is unveiled, including a $50 billion recovery package to offset the impending recession.
- 18 May – Statistics NZ announces that New Zealand's population reached five million during March, and estimates the population at 31 March as 5,002,100.
- 22 May – Todd Muller and Nikki Kaye are elected leader and deputy leader of the National Party in a leadership election, replacing Simon Bridges and Paula Bennett.

=== June ===
- 1 June – The 2020 Queen's Birthday Honours are announced.
- 8 June – COVID-19 in New Zealand: New Zealand moves to alert level 1 at 11:59 pm, removing nearly all social restrictions.
- 19 June – A fatal police shooting in West Auckland leaves a police officer dead and another seriously injured.
- 25 June – The Sixth Labour Government, with support from the Green Party and New Zealand First, passes legislation restoring suffrage for prisoners serving sentences less than three years. The bill was opposed by the opposition National and ACT parties.

=== July ===
- 7 July:
  - Sky New Zealand merges Lightbox into its Neon streaming service.
  - Hamish Walker, Member of Parliament for Clutha-Southland leaks sensitive information containing private details of COVID-19 patients. On the same day, Michelle Boag, former president of the National Party confesses that she sent the information to Walker. Boag resigns from her position as chief executive of the Auckland Rescue Helicopter Trust.
- 9 July – Rio Tinto announces that Tiwai Point smelter is set to close, leaving 1000 people out of employment.
- 14 July:
  - Todd Muller announces his immediate resignation as the leader of National Party, citing health reasons.
  - Judith Collins and Gerry Brownlee are elected new leader and deputy leader of the National Party.

=== August ===
- 11 August – COVID-19 in New Zealand: Four new cases of COVID-19 outside of a quarantine facility are reported.
- 12 August:
  - COVID-19 in New Zealand: At noon, Auckland enters alert level 3, while the rest of the country enters alert level 2.
  - The dissolution of Parliament, originally set for this day, is delayed until 17 August.
- 17 August:
  - Ardern announces that the 2020 New Zealand general election will be delayed until 17 October.
  - The dissolution of Parliament is also delayed, to 6 September.

=== September ===
- 4 September – COVID-19 in New Zealand: The first death from COVID-19 since 28 May is reported.
- 6 September – The 52nd New Zealand Parliament is dissolved.
- 29 September – Two people are charged over the New Zealand First Foundation fraud case.

=== October ===
- 4 October – A wildfire at Lake Ōhau causes the evacuation of 90 residents. As of 6 October, the fire had burnt 5,300 hectares, of which 1,900 hectares is conservation land.
- 17 October – The 2020 general election is held alongside referendums on personal cannabis consumption and euthanasia. Labour wins a majority of the seats in Parliament, continuing the Sixth Labour Government.

=== November ===
- 6 November – Official election results give Labour 65 seats, enough for a majority government, the first time a single party wins enough seats to govern alone since the mixed-member proportional representation (MMP) system was introduced in 1996.
- 9 November – A state of emergency is declared in Napier due to flooding.

=== December ===
- 9 December – The University of Otago cancels its end-of-year graduation ceremonies after receiving a security threat.
- 26 December – The Tasman region suffers a heavy hail storm, causing millions of dollars in physical and economic damage.
- 27 December – Manukura, a North Island brown kiwi, born entirely with white feathers, dies after deteriorating health following surgery.
- 29 December:
  - A large bushfire in Ahipara leads to local residents being evacuated.
  - 29 December - 3 January 2021 – Riots between inmates and prison guards at Waikeria Prison, causing major fire damage to the complex.
- 31 December – The 2021 New Year Honours are announced.

== Holidays and observances ==
Public holidays in New Zealand in 2020 are as follows:

- 1 January – New Year's Day
- 2 January – Day after New Year's Day
- 6 February – Waitangi Day
- 10 April – Good Friday
- 12 April – Easter Sunday
- 13 April – Easter Monday
- 25 April – Anzac Day
- 27 April – Anzac Day observed
- 1 June – Queen's Birthday
- 26 October – Labour Day
- 25 December – Christmas Day
- 26 December – Boxing Day
- 28 December – Boxing Day observed

== Sports ==
=== Sailing ===
- The 2020 America's Cup World Series is sailed in Auckland on 17–19 December, and is won by Team New Zealand in Te Rehutai, helmed by Peter Burling

=== Shooting ===
- Ballinger Belt –
  - David Black (Australia)
  - Allan White (Malvern), second, top New Zealander

=== Winter Youth Olympics ===
- New Zealand sent a team of 20 competitors across nine sports to the 2020 Winter Youth Olympics, held in Lausanne, Switzerland, on 9–22 January.

Gold	Silver	Bronze	Total
0	0	1	1

== Births ==
- 3 September – Ka Ying Rising, Thoroughbred racehorse
- 26 October – Orchestral, Thoroughbred racehorse

== Deaths ==
=== January ===
- 1 January – Dick Scott, historian and journalist (born 1923).
- 3 January – Ian Smith, archaeologist (University of Otago) (born 1954).
- 7 January – Rob Ronayne, lawyer and jurist, District Court judge (since 2013) (born 1955).
- 10 January – Tiny White, equestrianism competitor, judge and administrator (born 1924).
- 14 January – Bernard Diederich, author, journalist (Time), and historian, Maria Moors Cabot Prize (1976) (born 1926).
- 18 January – Piri Sciascia, Māori leader, kapa haka exponent, and university administrator (Victoria University of Wellington), kaumātua to the governor-general (since 2016) (born 1946).
- 22 January – John Kasper, cricketer (Auckland, Natal) (born 1946).
- 25 January
  - Shirley Murray, hymn writer (born 1931).
  - Dame Alison Roxburgh, women's rights advocate and community leader (born 1934).
- 26 January – Gordon McLauchlan, author, broadcaster and social historian, GOFTA for television presenter of the year (1987) (born 1931).
- 29 January:
  - Ruth Butterworth, political studies academic (University of Auckland), president of the Association of University Staff (1990–1991) (born 1934).
  - Keith Nelson, association footballer (Hamilton AFC, Mount Wellington, national team) (born 1947).
- 31 January:
  - Tony Ford, lawyer and jurist, judge of the Court of Appeal of Fiji (2005–2007), Chief Justice of Tonga (2006–2010), Employment Court judge (2010–2013) (born 1942).
  - Alison Preston-Thomas, netball player (national team) (born 1927).
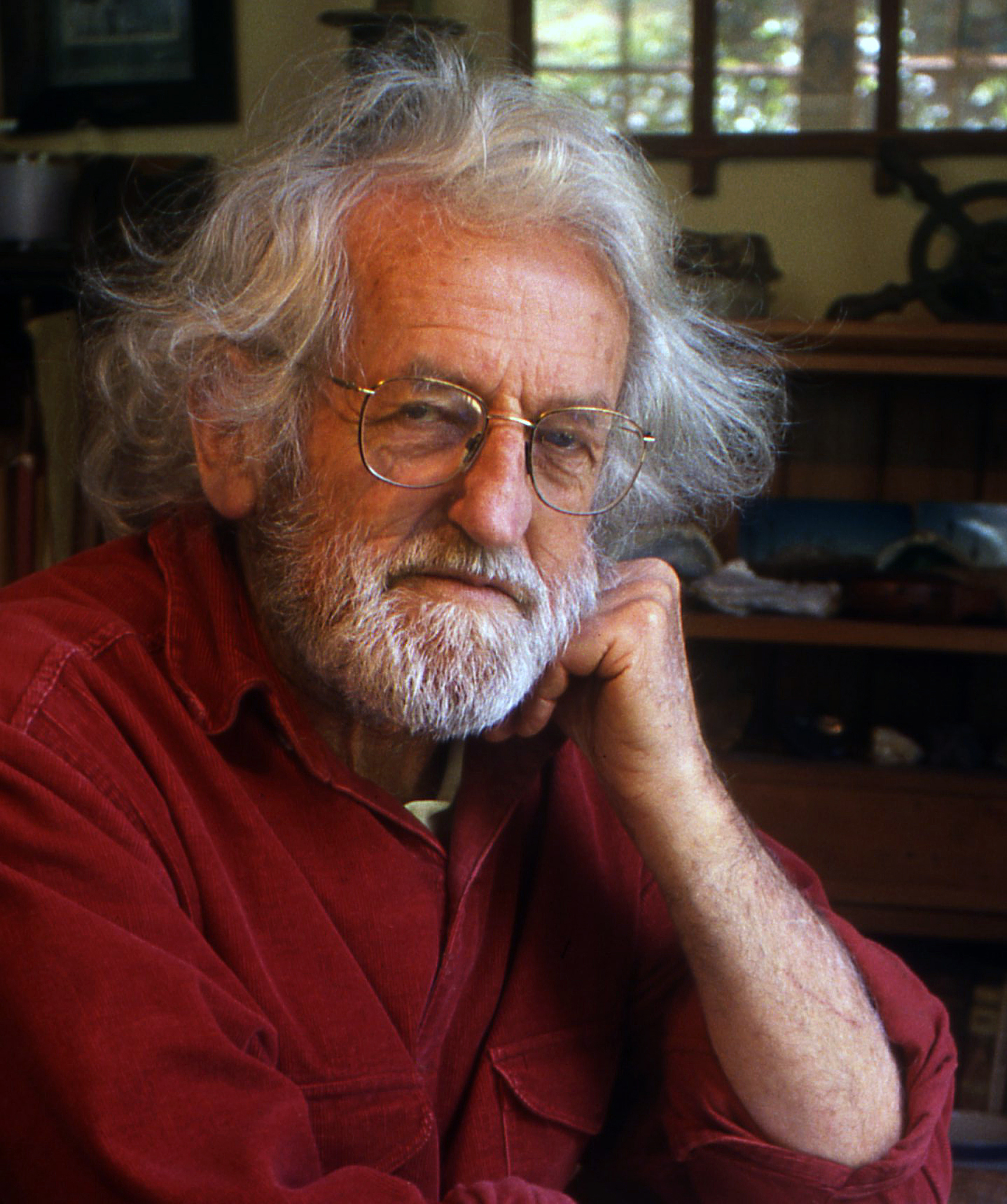
Dick Scott

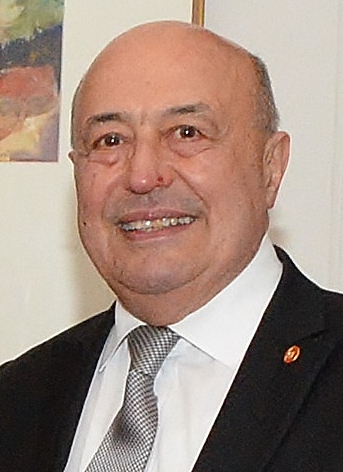
Piri Sciascia

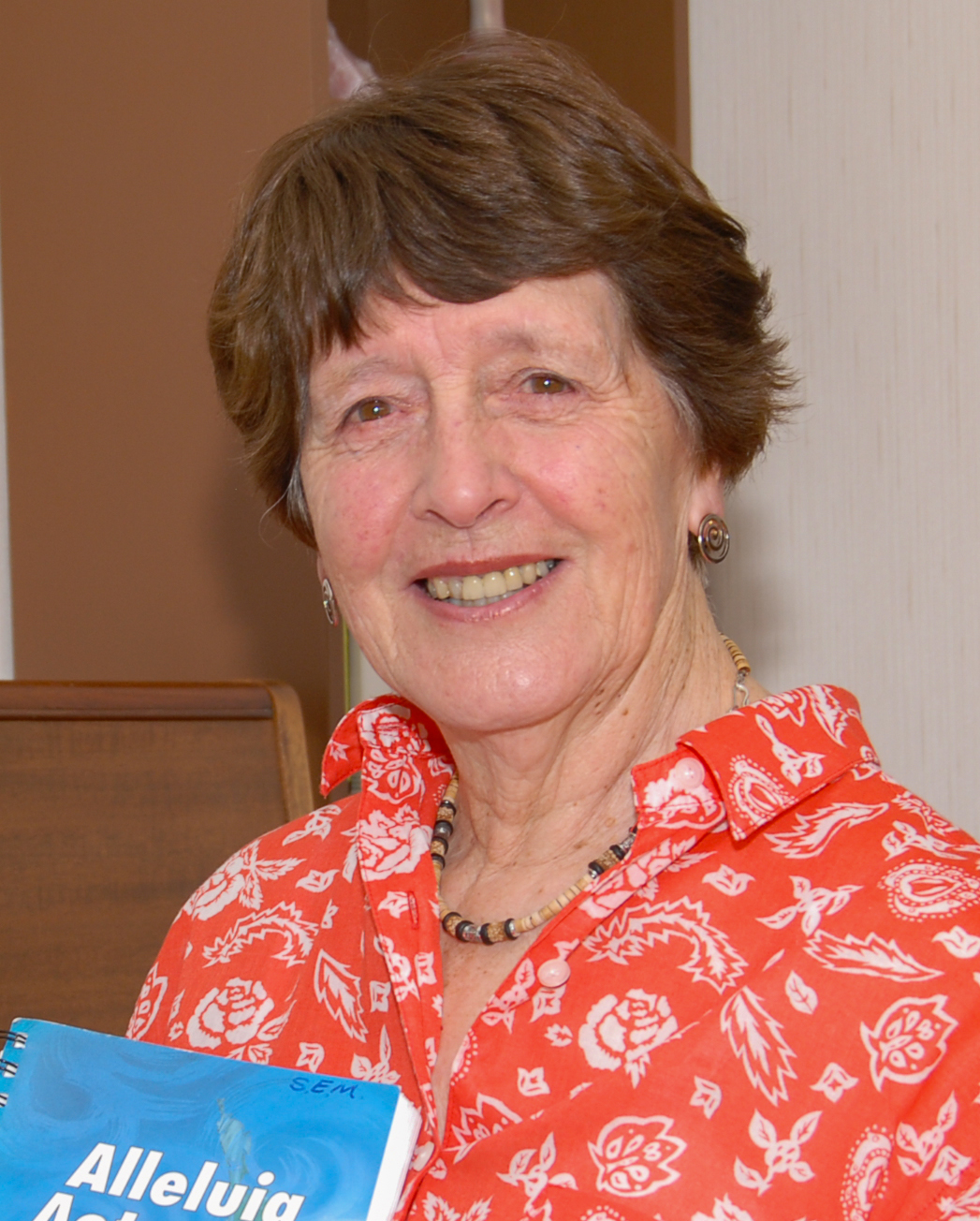
Shirley Murray

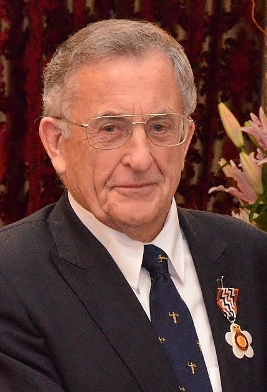
Tony Ford

=== February ===
- 1 February – Denford McDonald, mechanical engineer and businessman (Todd Motors, Mitsubishi New Zealand) (born 1929).
- 2 February – Mike Moore, politician and diplomat, MP (1972–1975, 1978–1999), Minister of Tourism (1984–1987), Minister of Overseas Trade (1984–1990), leader of the Labour Party (1990–1993), Prime Minister (1990), Director-General of the World Trade Organization (1999–2002), ambassador to the United States (2010–2015) (born 1949).
- 4 February:
  - Andrew Brough, Hall of Fame singer, songwriter and guitarist (Straitjacket Fits) (born 1963).
  - Peter Hogg, lawyer and legal scholar (Osgoode Hall Law School), Queen's Counsel (since 1980) (born 1939).
- 8 February – Lew Mander, organic chemist (University of Adelaide, Australian National University) (born 1939).
- 13 February:
  - Sir Des Britten, restaurateur, radio broadcaster (2ZB), television chef, and Anglican priest, Wellington City Missioner (1994–2011) (born 1939).
  - Jimmy Thunder, boxer, Commonwealth Games gold medallist (1986), IBO heavyweight world champion (1994–1995) (born 1966).
- 15 February – Alan Henderson, television cameraman and puppeteer (Thingee) (born c. 1962).
- 16 February – Graeme Allwright, singer and songwriter (born 1926).
- 17 February – Terry Lineen, rugby union player (Auckland, national team) (born 1936).
- 18 February – James Lobet, aircraft designer (Lobet Ganagobie) (born 1932).
- 19 February – Wes Sandle, physicist (University of Otago) (born 1935).
- 27 February – Tina Carline, radio announcer (2ZB, 2ZM, 2YA), television continuity announcer and weather presenter (WNTV1, TV One) (born 1948).
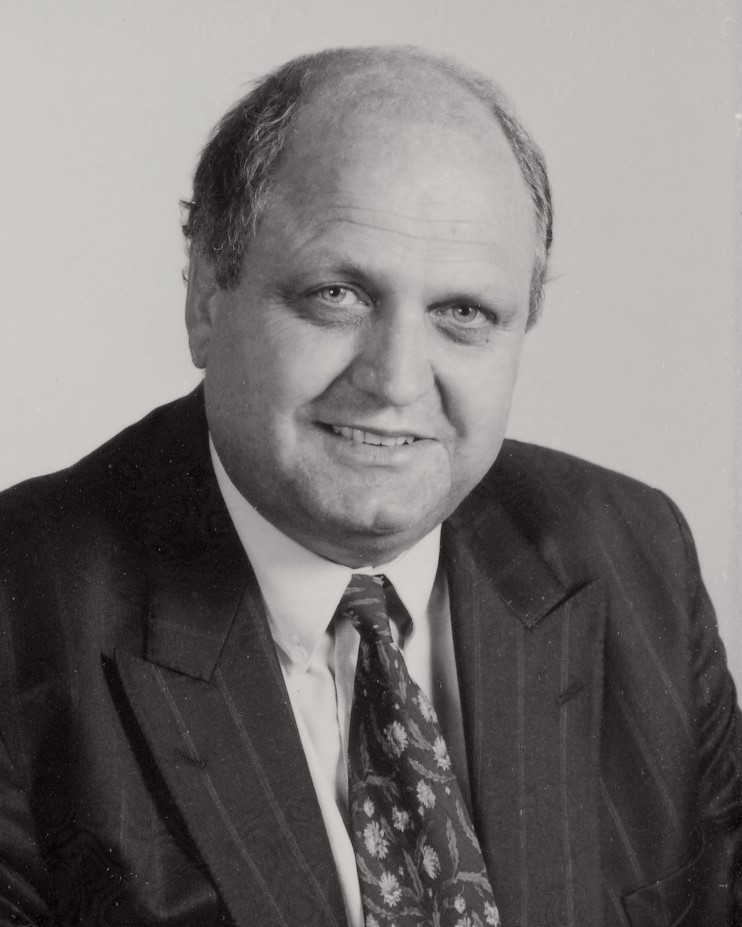
Mike Moore

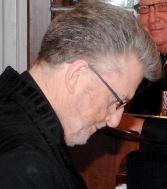
Sir Des Britten

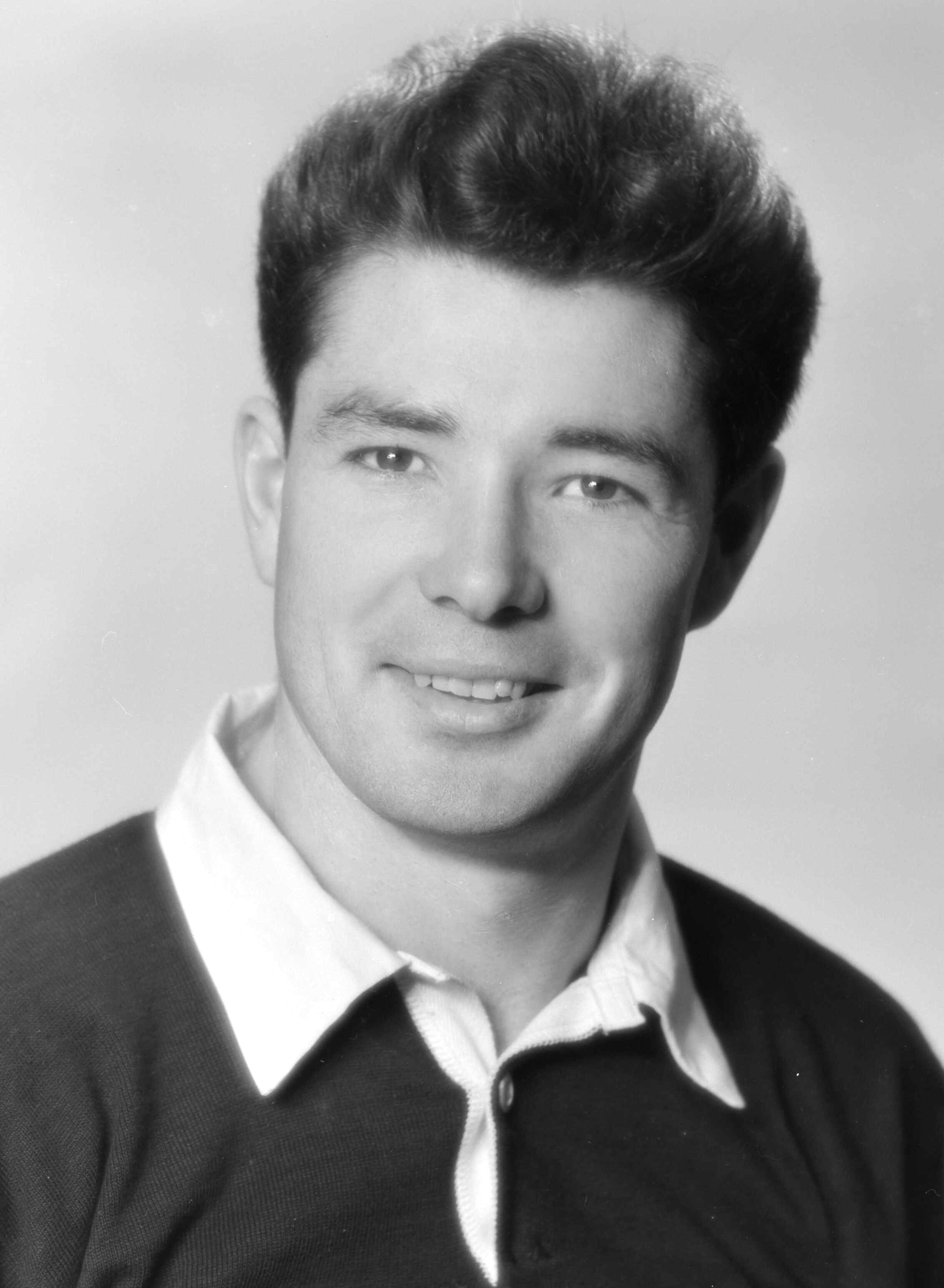
Terry Lineen

=== March ===
- 2 March – Roger Cooper, paleontologist (GNS Science), Hutton Medal (2017) (born 1939).
- 3 March – Kerry Marshall, local politician, Mayor of Richmond (1986–1989), Mayor of Tasman (1989–1998), Mayor of Nelson (2007–2010) (born 1940).
- 4 March – Helen Courtney, cartoonist and illustrator (Broadsheet) (born 1952).
- 5 March:
  - Troy Collings, travel executive (born c. 1986). (death announced on this date)
  - Shirley Cowles, cricketer (Canterbury, national team) (born 1939).
  - Jeanette Fitzsimons, politician and environmentalist, co-leader of the Green Party (1995–2009), Alliance list MP (1996–1999), MP for Coromandel (1999–2002), Green list MP (2002–2010) (born 1945).
- 11 March – Sir Rob Fenwick, Hall of Fame businessman and environmentalist, leader of the Progressive Green Party (1996–1998), chancellor of St John New Zealand (2006–2008), chair of Antarctica New Zealand (2008–2015) (born 1951).
- 14 March – Henry Smith, Olympic discus thrower (1984, 1988), South Pacific Games gold medallist (1983), shot putter (born 1955).
- 21 March – Cindy Beavis, radio broadcaster (Radio New Zealand, Access Radio) (born 1934).
- 22 March:
  - Bob McCullough, cricketer (Wellington) (born 1943).
  - Peter Stapleton, musician (The Terminals, Dadamah, Flies Inside The Sun) (born 1954).
- 26 March – Colin Graham, cricketer (Otago) (born 1929).
- 29 March – Claire Stewart, local politician, New Plymouth District Councillor (1989–1992), Mayor of New Plymouth (1992–2001) (born 1941).
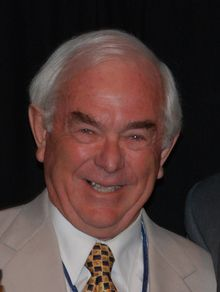
Kerry Marshall

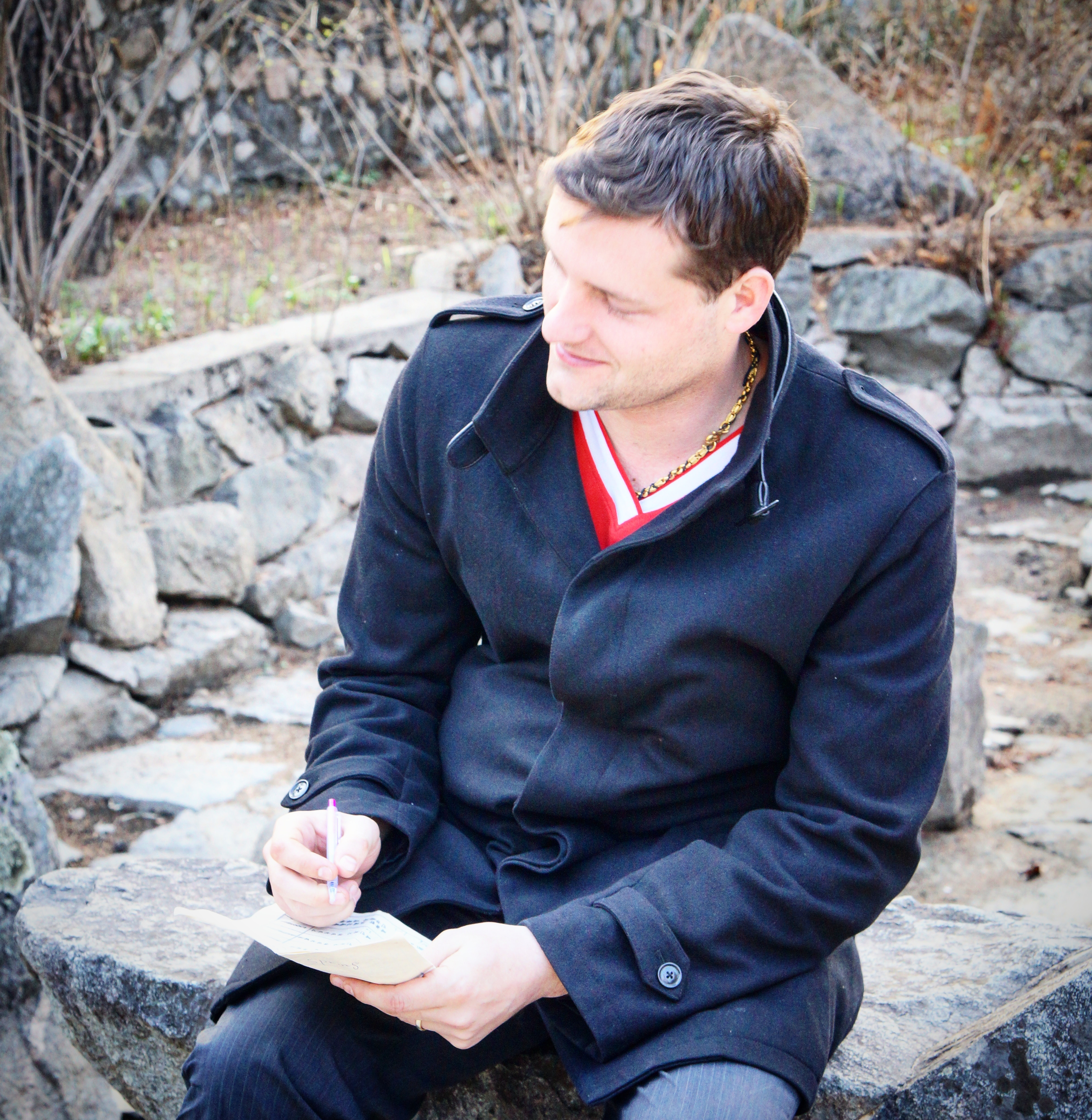
Troy Collings

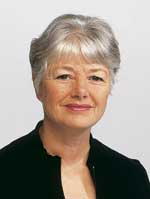
Jeanette Fitzsimons

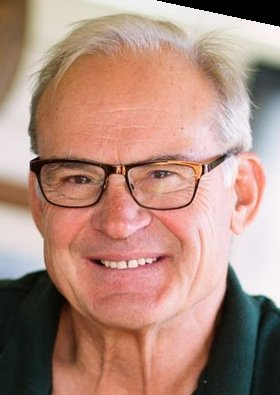
Sir Rob Fenwick

=== April ===
- 3 April – Eric Verdonk, Olympic rower (1988, 1992), Olympic bronze medallist (1988), world championship bronze medallist (1990), Commonwealth Games bronze medallist (1986) (born 1959).
- 6 April – Jock Edwards, cricketer (Central Districts, national team) (born 1955).
- 8 April – Te Huirangi Waikerepuru, Māori language activist and trade unionist (Tertiary Education Union) (born 1929).
- 11 April – Might and Power, Hall of Fame Thoroughbred racehorse, Caulfield Cup (1997), Melbourne Cup (1997), W. S. Cox Plate (1998) (foaled 1993).
- 14 April – Dean Parker, screenwriter (Came a Hot Friday, Old Scores), playwright, journalist, and political commentator, GOFTA Award (1986), TV Guide Television Award (1998), New Zealand Arts Foundation Laureate (2010) (born 1947).
- 22 April – Dennis Copps, cricket umpire (born 1929).
- 23 April – Bruce Allpress, actor (Close to Home, The Scarecrow, The Lord of the Rings: The Two Towers), Feltex Television Awards best actor (1981, 1983) (born 1930).
- 24 April – Phil Broadhurst, jazz musician, composer, music educator (Massey University), and radio presenter (Radio New Zealand), New Zealand Music Awards best jazz artist (2016) (born 1949).
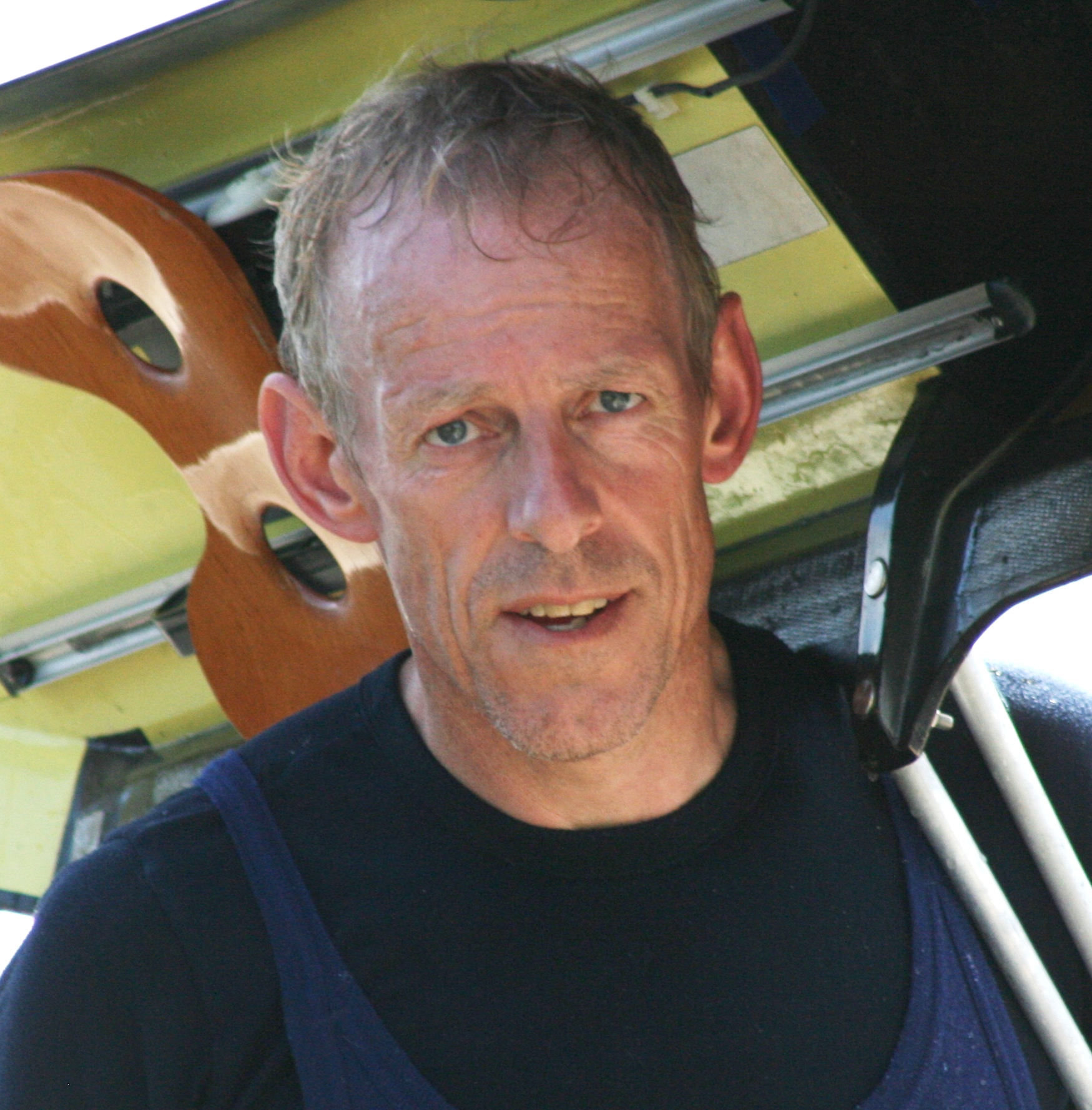
Eric Verdonk

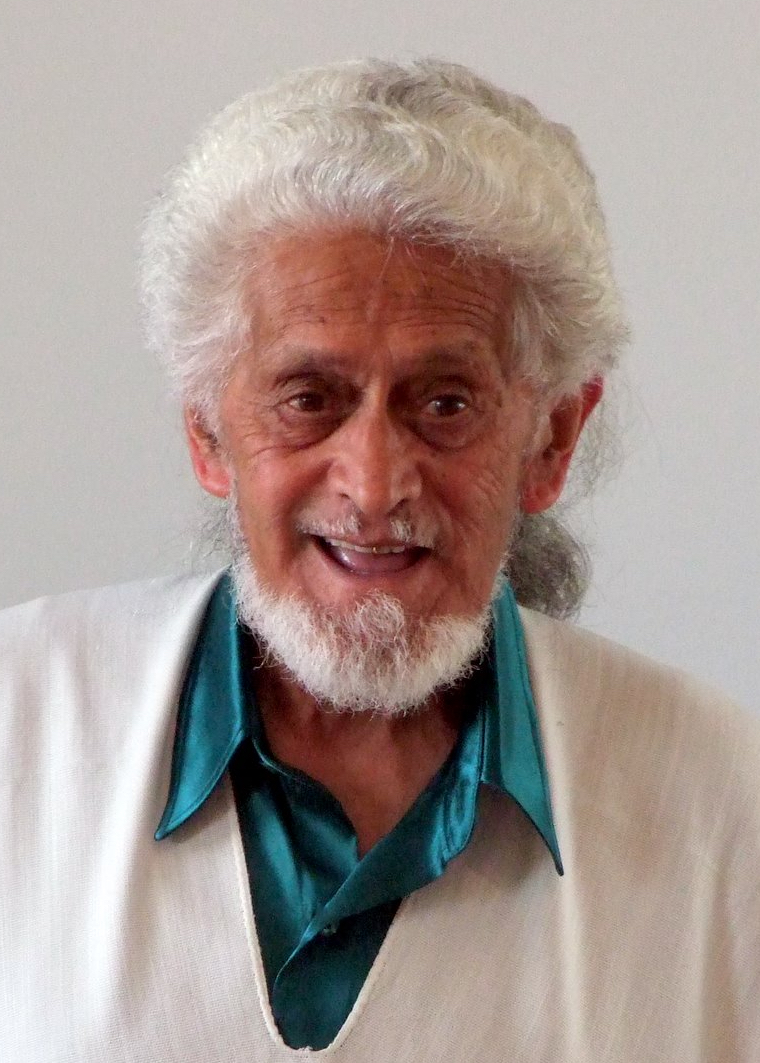
Te Huirangi Waikerepuru

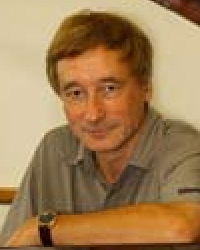
Phil Broadhurst

=== May ===
- 3 May – Geoff Anderson, cricketer (Otago) (born 1939).
- 4 May – Alan Sutherland, rugby union player (Marlborough, national team) (born 1944).
- 7 May:
  - Margaret Loutit, microbiologist (University of Otago) (born 1929).
  - George Simpkin, rugby union coach (Waikato, Fiji, Hong Kong) (born 1943).
- 8 May – James Hill, Olympic rower (1956, 1960), British Empire and Commonwealth Games gold (1962), silver and bronze (1958) medallist (born 1930).
- 14 May – Tony Coll, rugby league player (West Coast, national team), local-body politician, Grey District Councillor (2011–2019) (born c. 1950).
- 15 May – Rick Muru, rugby league player (Waikato, New Zealand Māori, national team) (born c. 1950).
- 29 May – Susie Simcock, squash player and administrator, president of the World Squash Federation (1996–2002), New Zealand Olympic Committee board member (1996–2008) (born 1938).
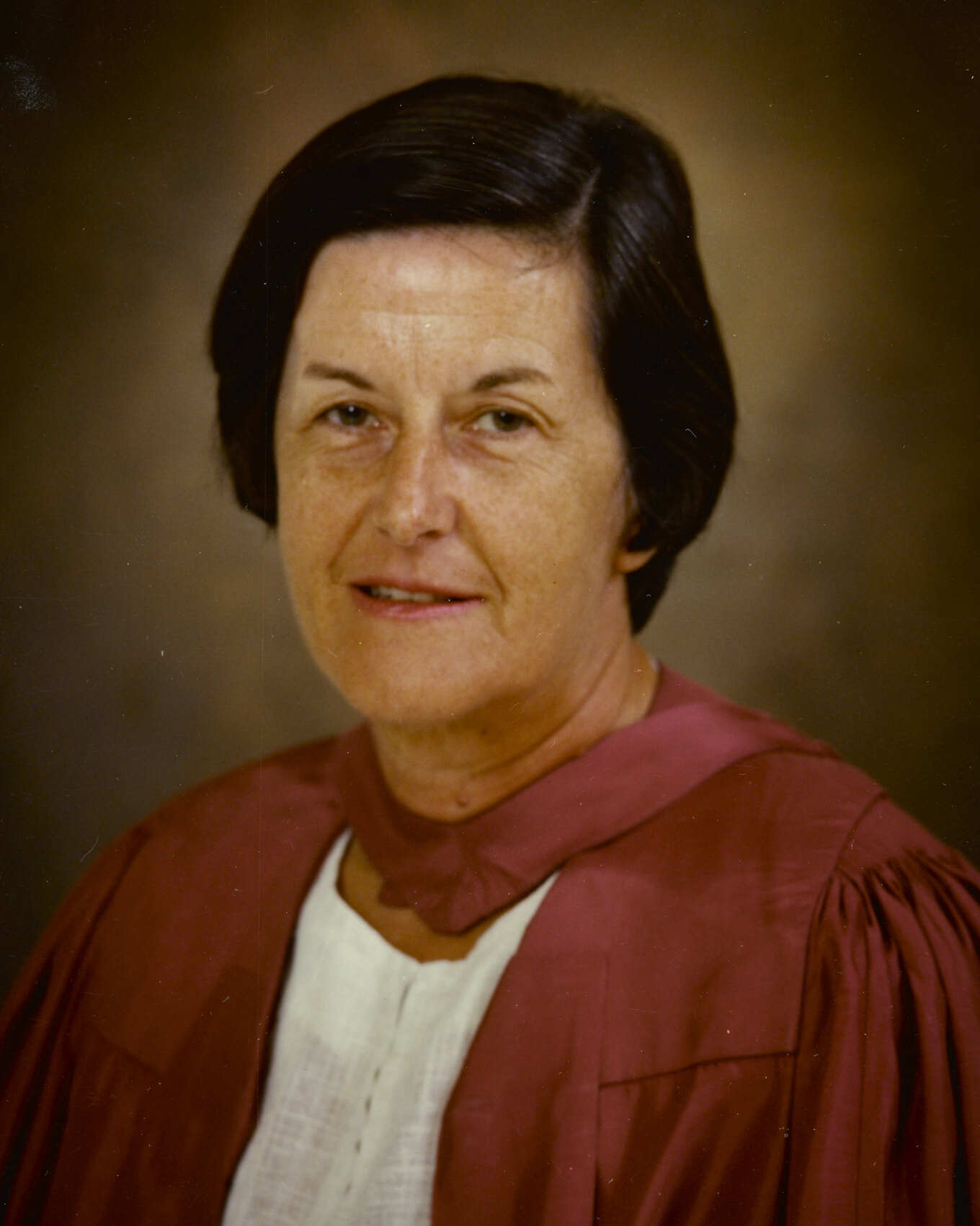
Margaret Loutit

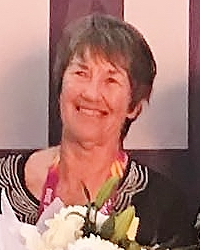
Susie Simcock

=== June ===
- 1 June – Giyannedra Prasad, Fijian lawyer and politician (born 1959)
- 2 June:
  - Leslie Kay, electrical engineer (University of Canterbury), Fellow of the Royal Society of New Zealand (since 1971) (born 1922).
  - Lindsay Townsend, rugby union player (Otago, national team) (born 1934).
- 10 June:
  - Joan Ferner, women's rights advocate and public servant (born 1933).
  - Murray Hill, seed technologist (Massey University, Lincoln University) (born 1939).
- 11 June:
  - Basil Meeking, Roman Catholic prelate, Bishop of Christchurch (1987–1995) (born 1929).
  - Matt Poore, cricketer (Canterbury, national team) (born 1930).
- 13 June – Krystyna Tomaszyk, writer and social activist (born 1932).
- 16 June – Alistair Soper, rugby union player (Southland, national team) (born 1936).
- 17 June – Paul Matete, rugby league player (Auckland, New Zealand Māori, national team) and coach (South Africa) (born 1949).
- 18 June – Jim Young, boat builder and designer (born 1925).
- 19 June – Matthew Hunt, police officer (born 1991).
- 20 June – Aaron Tokona, musician (Weta, Fly My Pretties, Cairo Knife Fight) (born 1975).
- 21 June – Dennis Young, rugby union player (Canterbury, national team) (born 1930).
- 22 June – Stewart Speed, cricketer (Auckland) (born 1942).
- 23 June – Mike McCool, rugby union player (Hawke's Bay, Wairarapa Bush, national team) (born 1951).
- 24 June – Toni Waho, Māori language advocate and educationalist (born c. 1961).
- 28 June:
  - John Kneebone, farming leader and local-body politician, president of Federated Farmers (1974–1977), Matamata County Councillor (1959–1967), member of the Waitangi Tribunal (1989–2006) (born 1935).
  - Jim Ross, educationalist and public servant (born 1930).
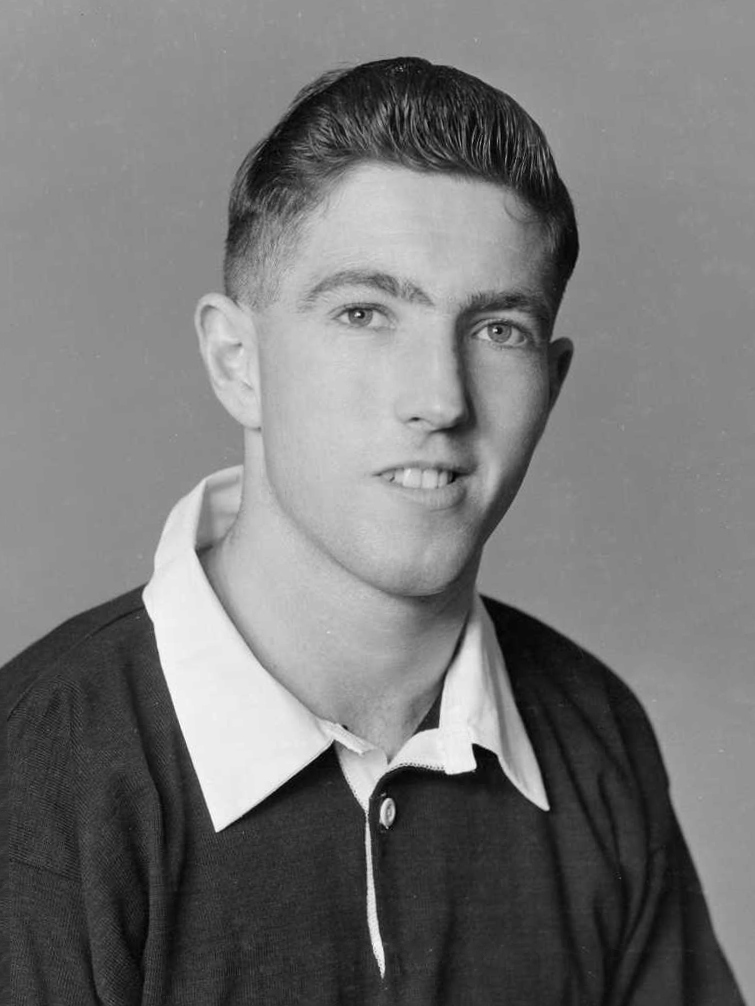
Lindsay Townsend

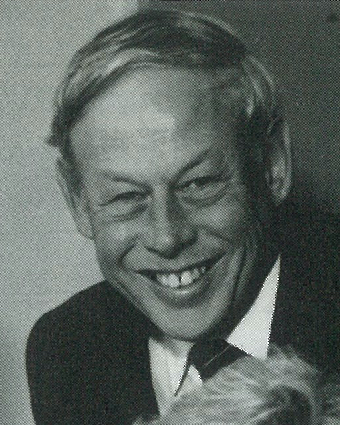
Murray Hill

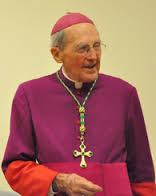
Basil Meeking

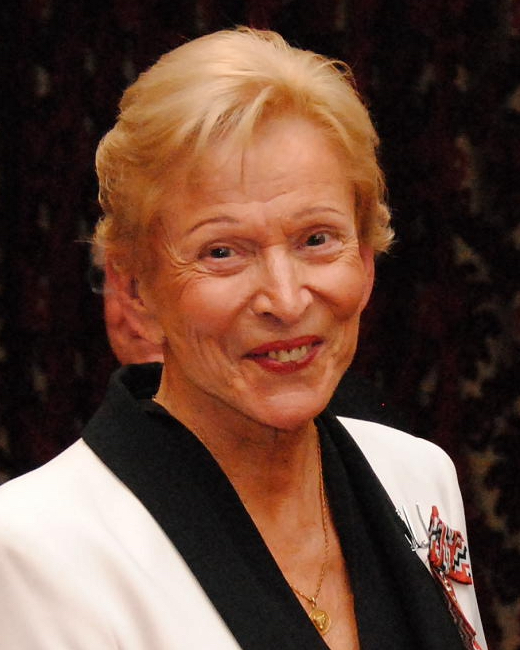
Krystyna Tomaszyk

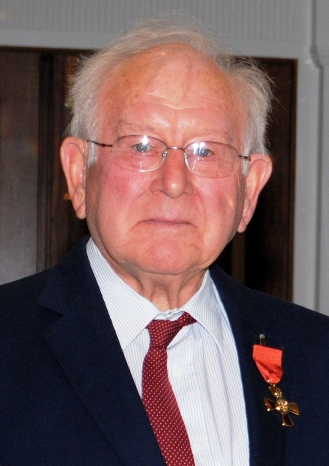
Jim Young

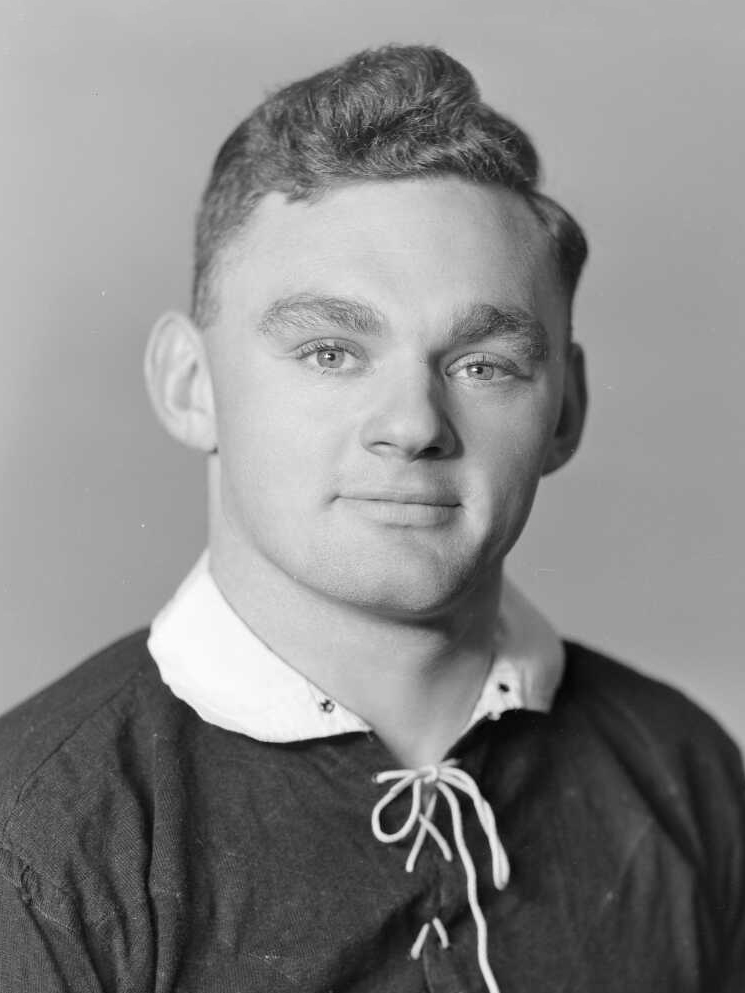
Dennis Young

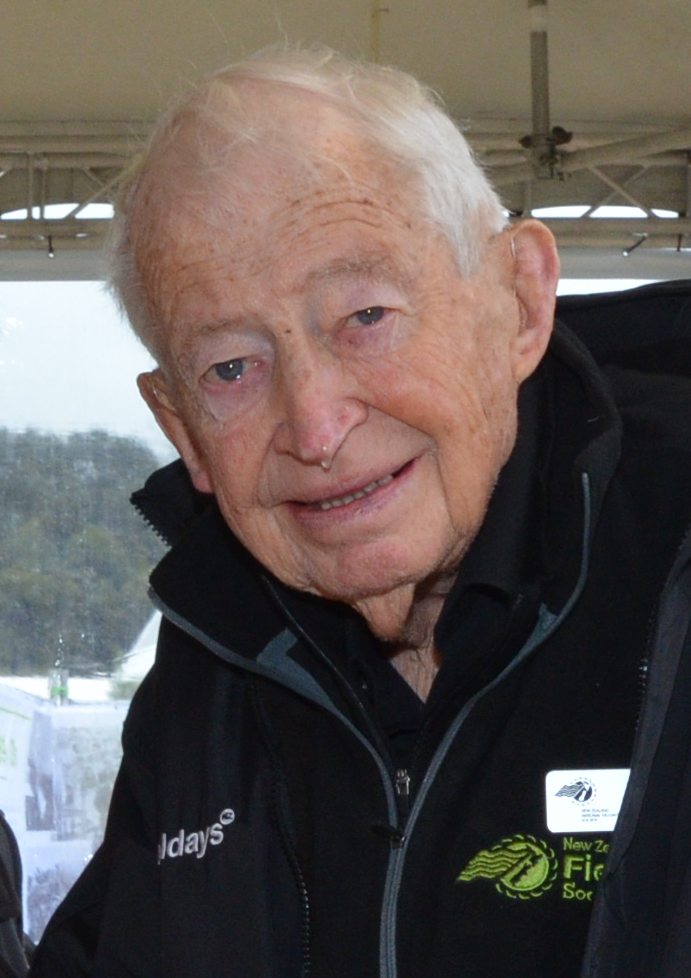
John Kneebone

=== July ===
- 1 July – Bill Black, pilot, live deer capture pioneer (born 1943).
- 2 July – Bill Massey, Hall of Fame softball player (national team), coach and umpire, world championship bronze medallist (1966) (born 1936).
- 10 July – Genevieve Westcott, journalist and television presenter (TV3) (born 1955).
- 12 July:
  - Kevin Dwyer, cricketer (Auckland) (born 1929).
  - Robert Welch, agricultural biotechnologist (AgResearch) (born 1938).
- 14 July – James Brown, public servant, official secretary to the governor-general (1977–1985) (born 1925).
- 20 July – Ross Dallow, police officer and local-body politician, Waitakere City Councillor (1992–2010) (born 1937).
- 21 July – Bruce McPhail, rugby union player (Canterbury, Nelson, national team) (born 1937).
- 29 July – Andy Haden, rugby union player (Auckland, national team) (born 1950).
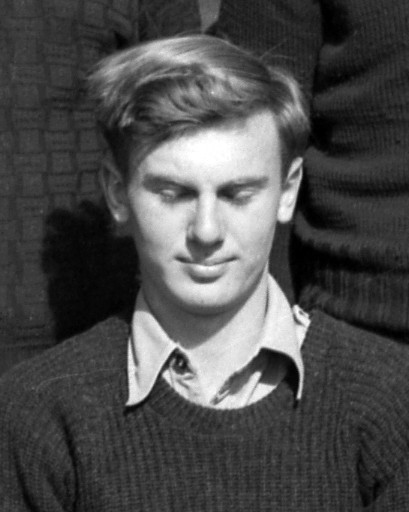
Robert Welch

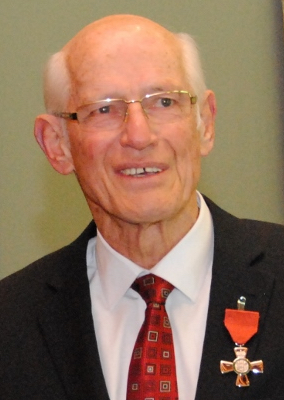
Ross Dallow

=== August ===
- 2 August – Tony Campbell, biblical scholar (United Faculty of Theology) (born 1934).
- 4 August – Murray Cheater, Olympic (1976) and Commonwealth Games (1974) hammer thrower (born 1947).
- 6 August – Lindsay Brown, accountant and university administrator, chancellor of the University of Otago (2004–2008) (born c. 1944).
- 8 August – Jean Stewart, Hall of Fame swimmer, Olympic bronze medallist (1952), British Empire Games silver medallist (1950) and British Empire and Commonwealth Games bronze medallist (1954) (born 1930).
- 9 August – Heta Hingston, 82, lawyer and jurist, Māori Land Court judge (1984–1999) (born 1938).
- 10 August:
  - Vinka Lucas, fashion designer and retailer, magazine founder (born 1932).
  - Don Martin, musician (Mi-Sex) (born c. 1954).
- 12 August – Jean Anderson, pianist and professor of music (Royal Academy of Music) (born 1923).
- 21 August – Sir Bob Elliott, paediatrician (University of Auckland) (born 1934).
- 23 August – Jack Tynan, Olympic field hockey player (1956), and cricketer (Wellington) (born 1925).
- 25 August – Graham Newdick, cricketer (Wellington) (born 1949).
- 26 August:
  - Keri Kaa, writer, educator (Wellington College of Education, Te Wānanga o Raukawa), and Māori language advocate (born 1942).
  - Douglas MacDiarmid, artist (born 1922).
- 27 August – Ivan Keats, Olympic marathon runner (1964) (born 1937).
- 28 August – Don Bacon, microbiologist (University of Otago, Massey University) (born 1926).
- 31 August – Megan Wraight, landscape architect (Waitangi Park, Wynyard Quarter, Pukeahu National War Memorial Park), Arts Foundation of New Zealand Laureate Award (2013) (born 1961).
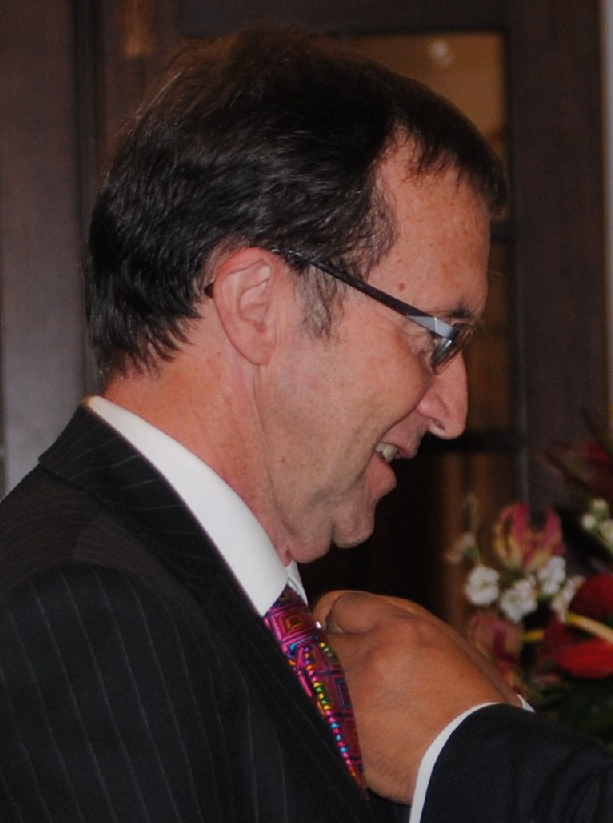
Lindsay Brown

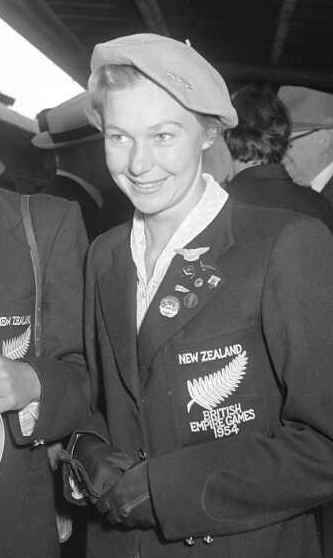
Jean Stewart

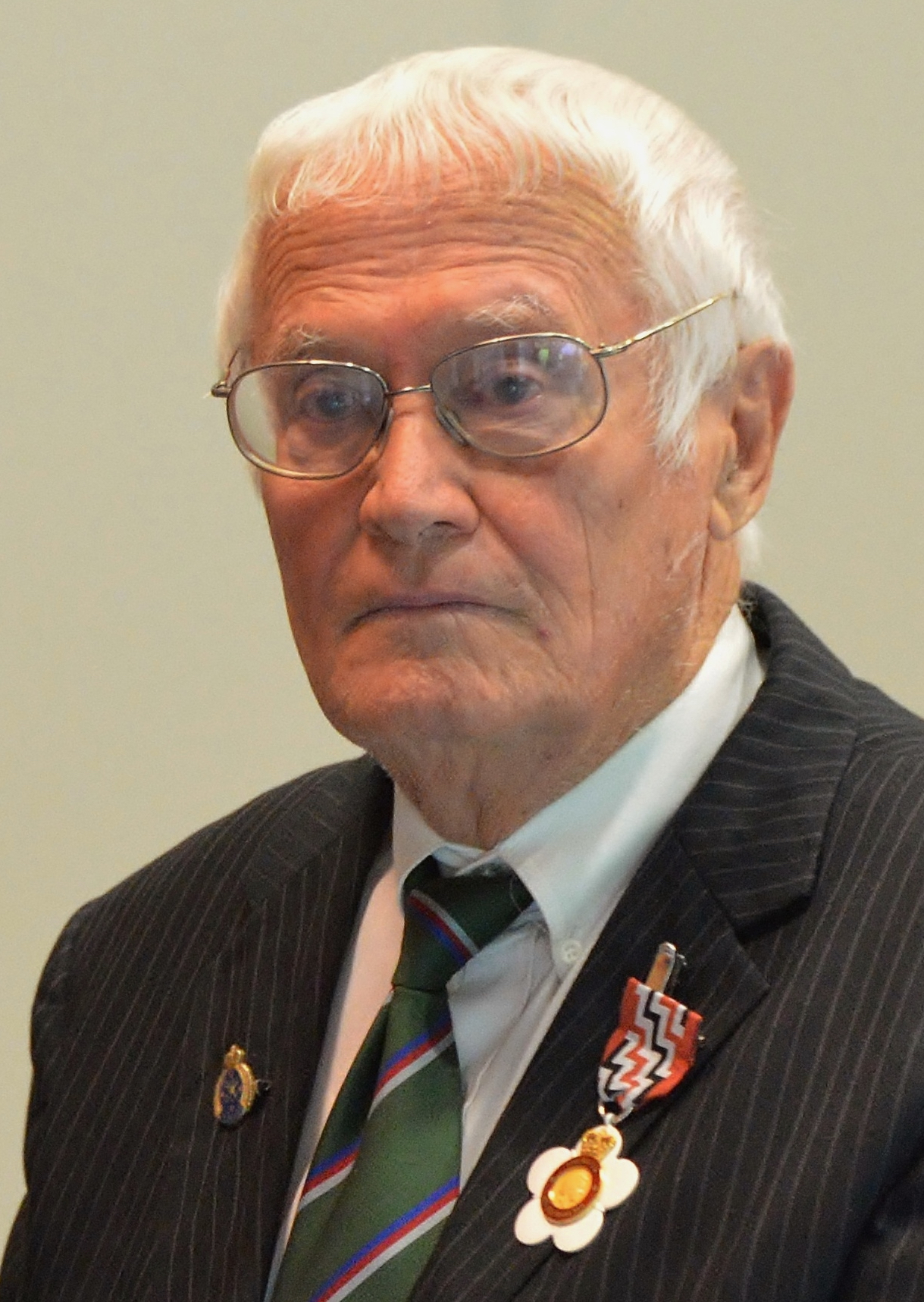
Heta Kingston

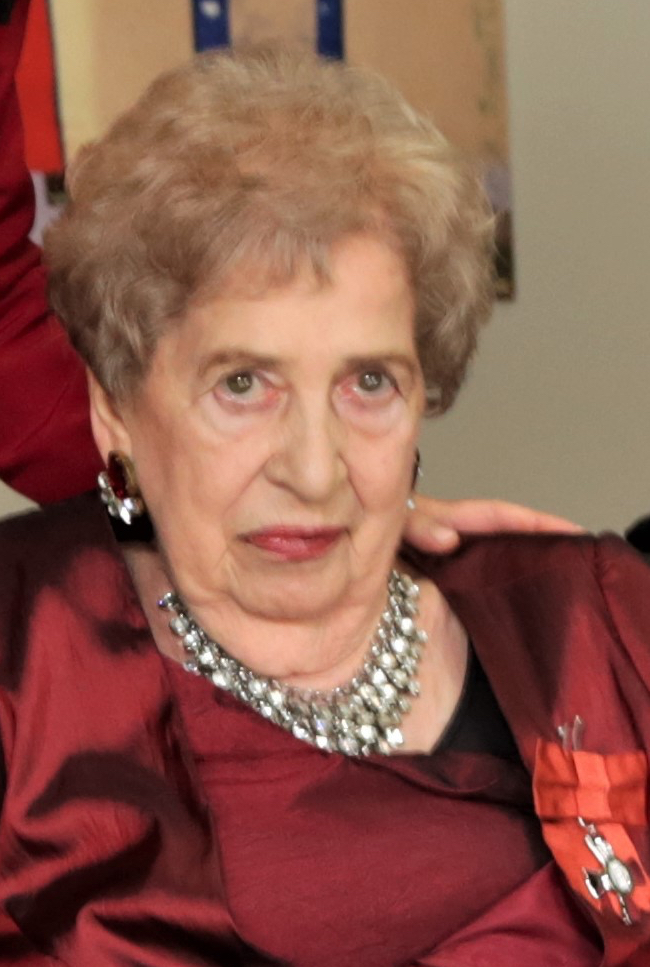
Vinka Lucas

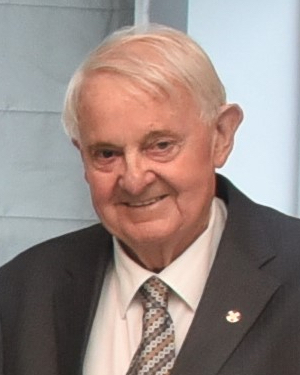
Sir Bob Elliott

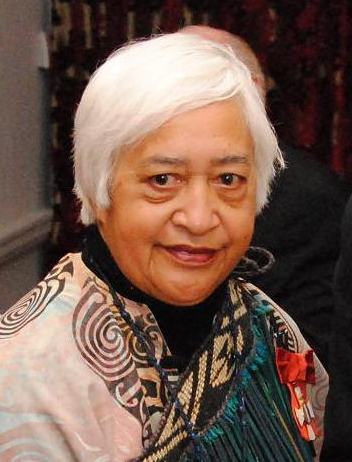
Keri Kaa

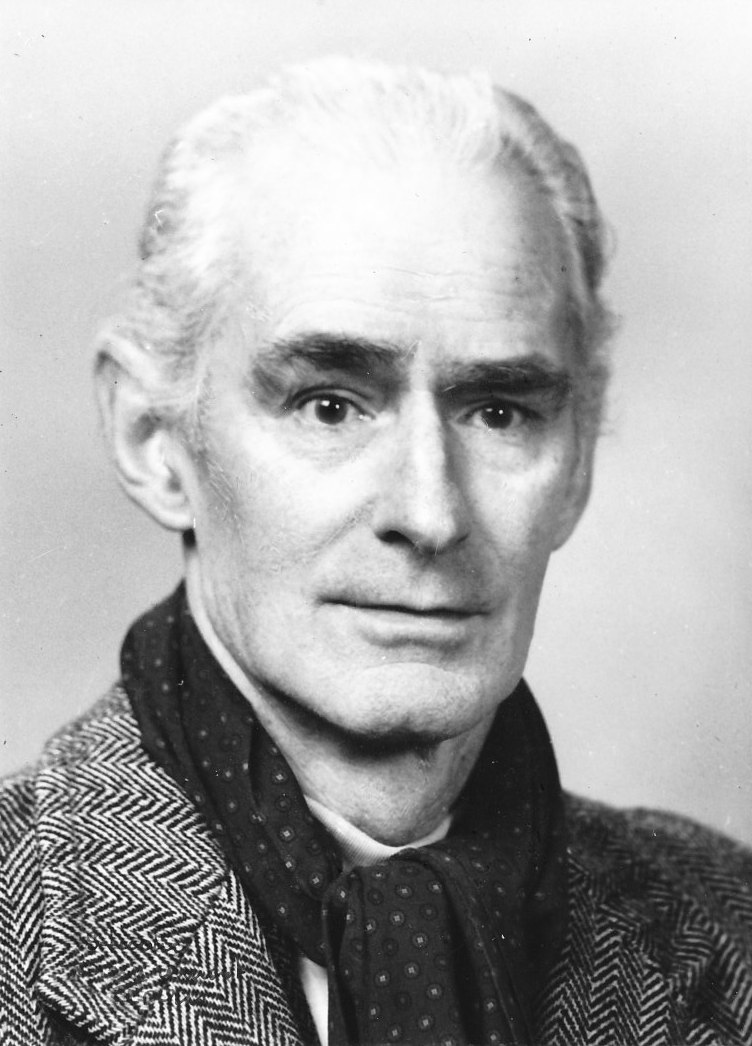
Douglas MacDiarmid

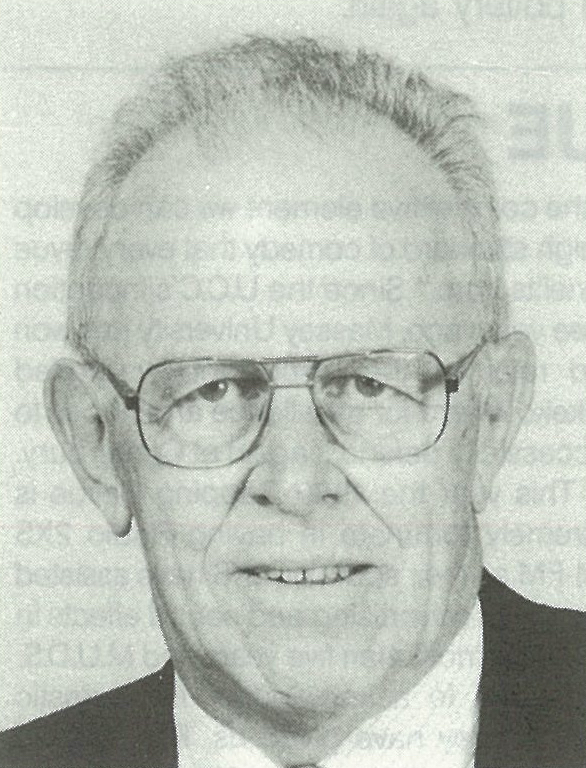
Don Bacon

=== September ===
- 2 September – John Shrapnell, journalist, actor and singer (born 1934).
- 4 September – Joe Williams, politician, doctor and health researcher, Prime Minister of the Cook Islands (1999) (born 1934).
- 5 September – David Walter, local-body politician and journalist (Taranaki Daily News), Mayor of Stratford (1989–1998), Chair of Taranaki Regional Council (2001–2007) (born 1939).
- 6 September – Sir Vaughan Jones, mathematician (Jones polynomial, Aharonov–Jones–Landau algorithm), Fields Medal (1990), Rutherford Medal (1991), Fellow of the Royal Society (since 1990) (born 1952).
- 8 September – Jane Soons, geomorphologist (University of Canterbury), president of the International Union for Quaternary Research (1977–1982) (born 1931).
- 13 September:
  - Kirsty Durward, gymnast, Commonwealth Games bronze medallist (1978) (born c. 1959).
  - Dave Halligan, rugby union player (Otago, Auckland) (born 1959).
- 15 September – Nigel Te Hiko, historian, Ngāti Raukawa leader (born c. 1966).
- 17 September – Don McGregor, zoologist (University of Otago) and science advisor, Ministry of Research, Science and Technology chief scientist (1992–1997) (born 1938).
- 24 September – Max Merritt, Hall of Fame singer-songwriter and guitarist ("Slipping Away", Max Merritt and the Meteors) (born 1941).
- 25 September – Matt Ratana, police officer (born 1966).
- 29 September – John Whittaker, rugby league player (Wellington, Warrington, national team) (born 1950).
- 30 September – Guy Natusch, architect (born 1921).
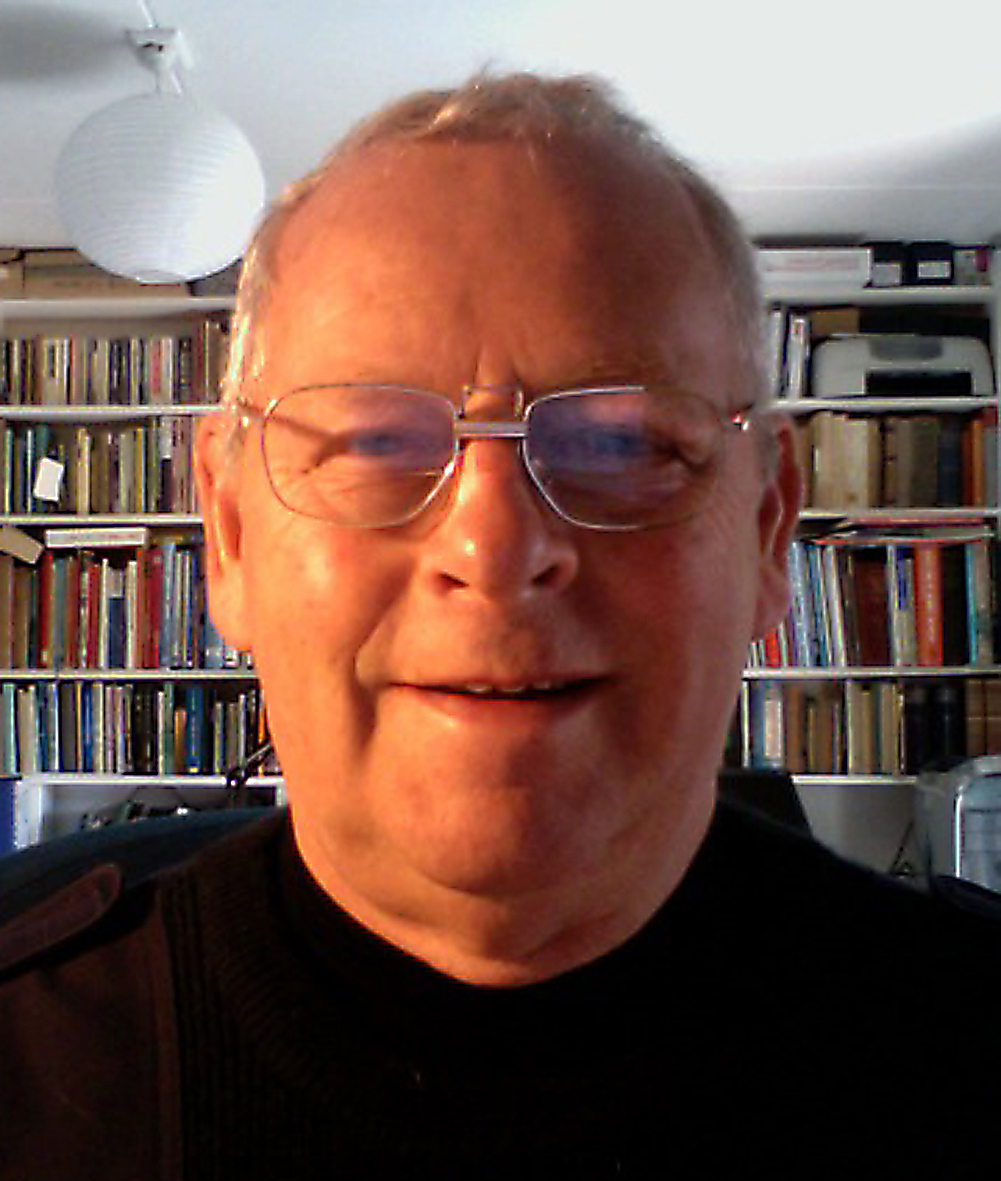
John Shrapnell

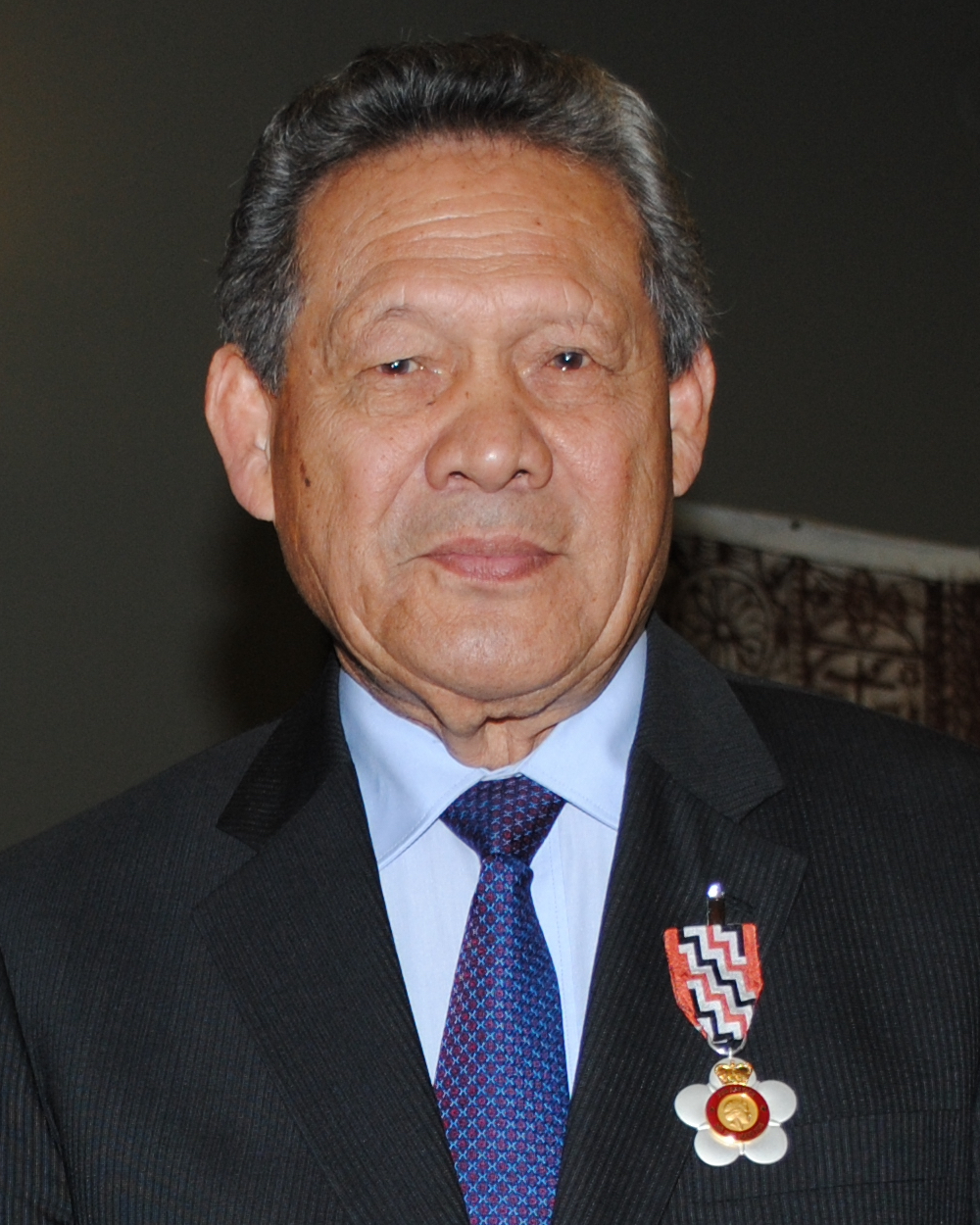
Joe Williams

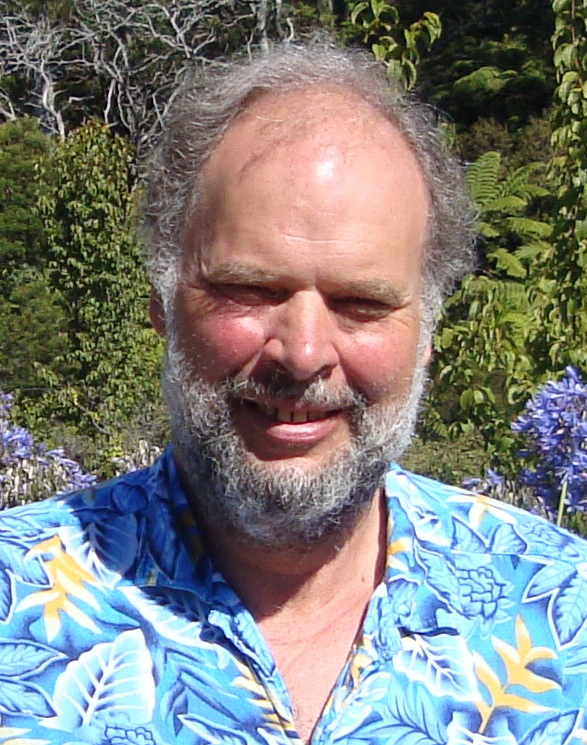
Sir Vaughan Jones

=== October ===
- 5 October – John Tanner, rugby union player (Otago, Auckland, national team) (born 1927).
- 8 October – Jack Sutherland, athlete, British Empire Games bronze medallist (1950) (born 1927).
- 14 October – John Reid, Hall of Fame cricketer (Wellington, Otago, national team) and cricket administrator, international match referee (1993–2002), president of New Zealand Cricket (2004–2006), New Zealand Sportsman of the Year (1955), Wisden Cricketer of the Year (1959) (born 1928).
- 18 October – Eddie Tonks, rugby union administrator, chair of the New Zealand Rugby Football Union (1990–1995) (born 1934).
- 23 October – David Barnes, sailor, 470 world champion (1981, 1983, 1984) and world championship bronze medallist (1982), America's Cup skipper (KZ1, 1988) (born 1958).
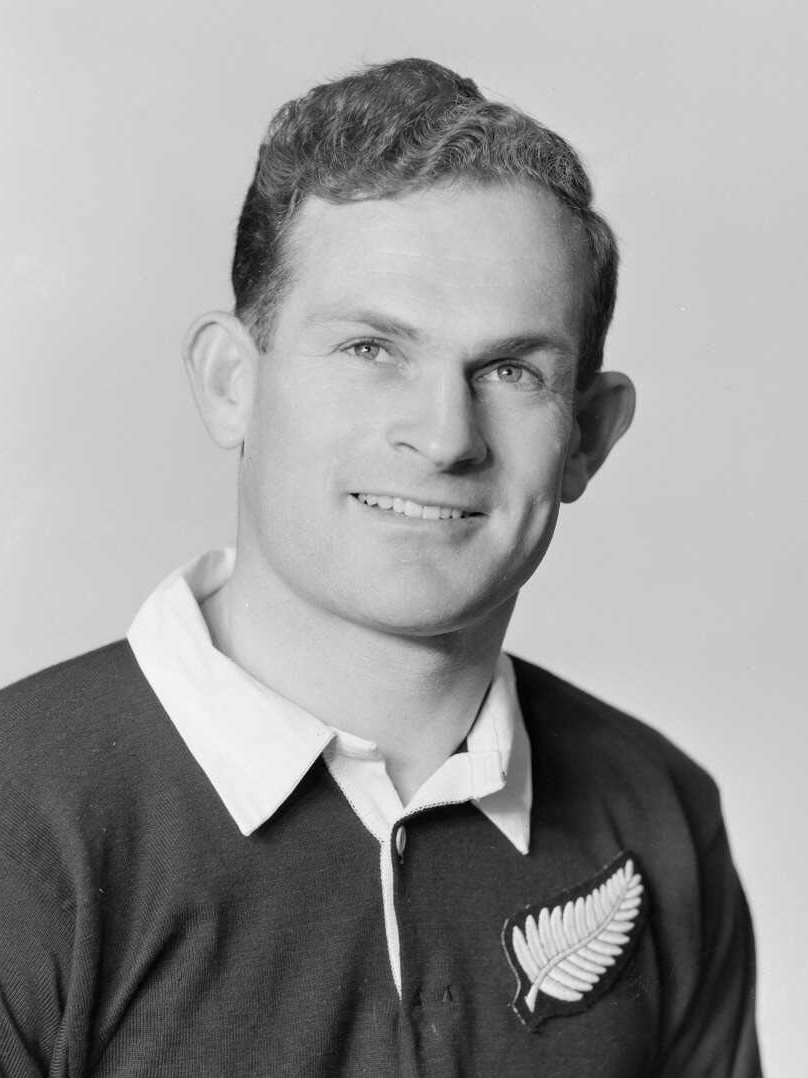
John Tanner

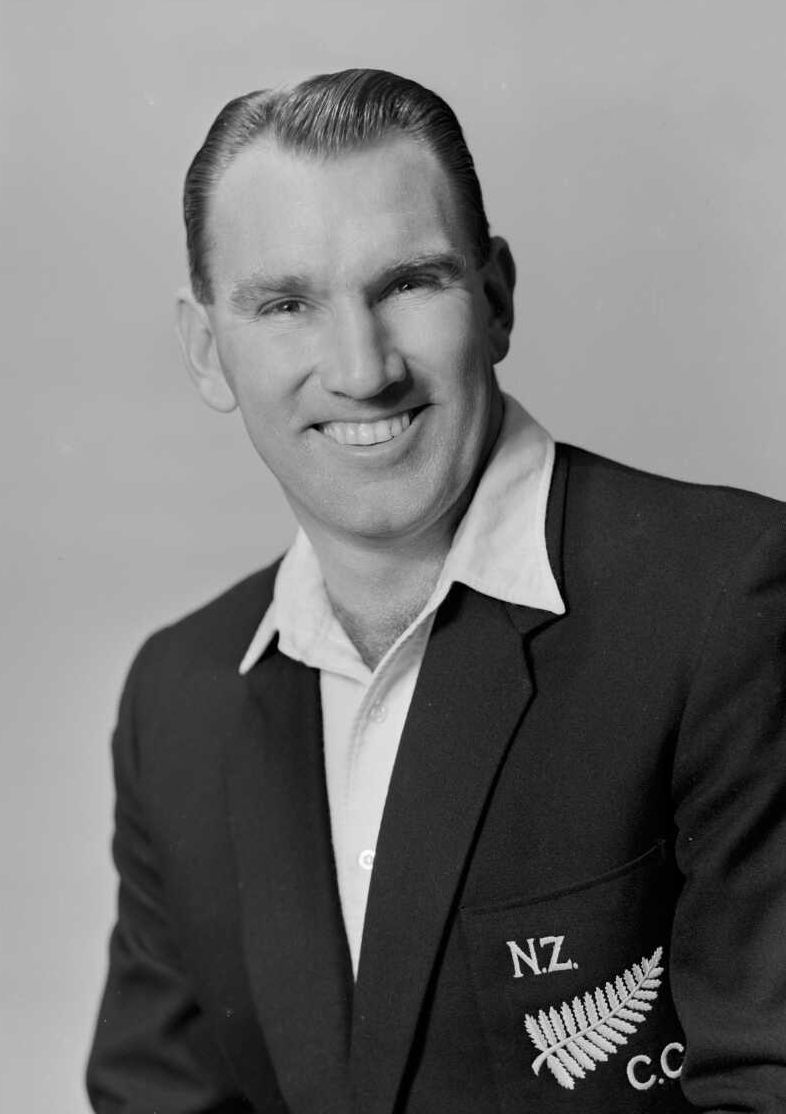
John Reid

=== November ===
- 2 November – Trevor Malloch, cricketer (Wellington) (born 1928).
- 7 November – Bones Hillman, musician (Suburban Reptiles, The Swingers, Midnight Oil) (born 1958).
- 21 November – Rufus Rehu, musician (Quincy Conserve) (born 1939)
- 25 November:
  - Marion Law, netball player (national team) and tennis player, All India women's singles and doubles champion (1965) (born 1940).
  - Alan Powell, historian (Charles Darwin University) (born 1936).
- 30 November – Ross Dykes, cricket player (Auckland), administrator and match referee, national selector (1990–2005), chief executive officer of Otago Cricket (2005–2015) (born 1945).
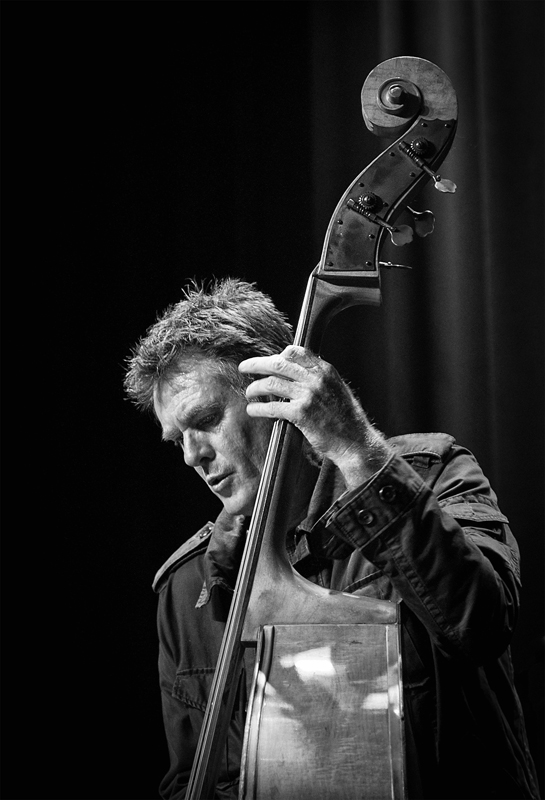
Bones Hillman

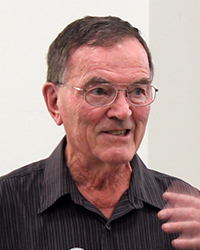
Alan Powell

=== December ===
- 4 December – Anand Singh, Fijian politician (born 1948).
- 5 December – Des Ferrow, cricketer (Northern Districts) (born 1933).
- 7 December – Malcolm Simpson, Olympic (1952) and British Empire Games (1950) cyclist (born 1933).
- 8 December – Gerard Stokes, rugby league player (Canterbury, national team, Workington Town) and coach (Workington Town, Whitehaven, Serbia national team) (born 1955).
- 10 December – Barry Wynks, Commonwealth Games lawn bowls player (2002, 2014, 2018) and silver medallist (2014, 2018) (born 1952).
- 11 December – James Flynn, political scientist (University of Otago), intelligence researcher (Flynn effect), and politician (NewLabour, Alliance) (born 1934).
- 13 December – Rose Pere, educationalist, Māori language advocate, and conservationist (born 1937).
- 16 December – Brian Pickworth, Olympic (1960) and British Empire and Commonwealth Games (1958, 1962, 1966, 1970) fencer, British Empire and Commonwealth Games bronze medallist (1962) (born 1929).
- 17 December – Ed Nichols, Paralympic alpine skier (1980) (born 1923).
- 20 December – Arthur Campbell, analytical chemist (University of Otago) (born 1925).
- 25 December – David Thorns, sociologist (University of Auckland, University of Canterbury), Fellow of the Royal Society of New Zealand (since 1995) (born 1943).
- 27 December – Manukura, white North Island brown kiwi (hatched 2011).
- 28 December – John Reid, cricketer (Auckland, national team) (born 1956).
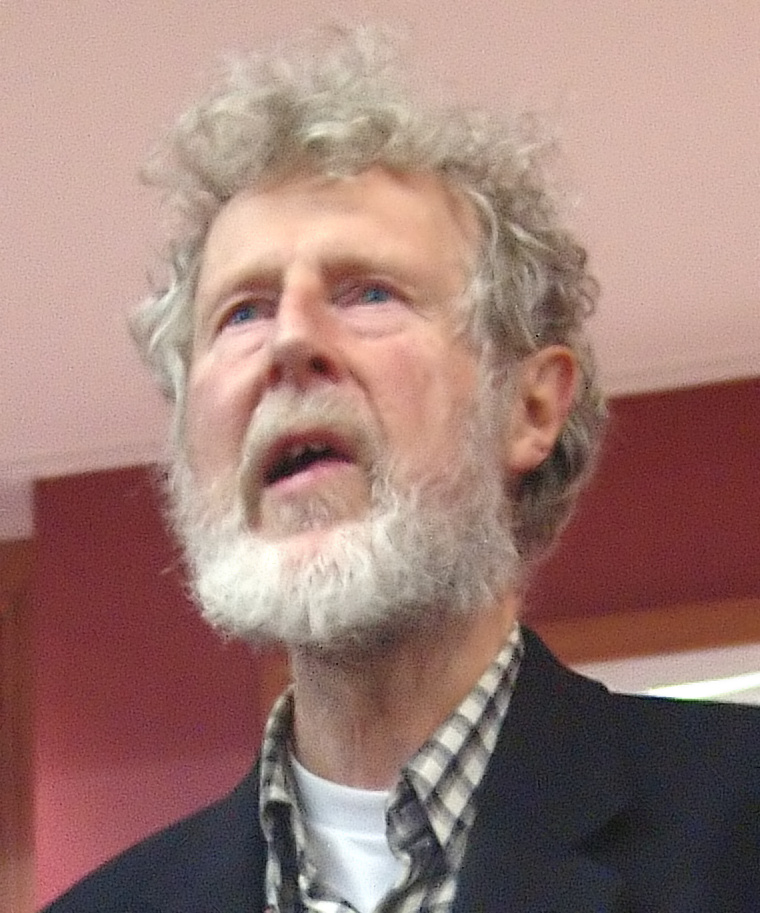
Jim Flynn
