= Rob Ronayne =

New Zealand lawyer and jurist (1955–2020)

District Court judge
- In office 22 March 2013 – 7 January 2020

Personal details
- Born: Robert Graeme Ronayne; 1955
- Died: 7 January 2020 (aged 64) Auckland, New Zealand
- Children: 2
- Occupation: Lawyer

Robert Graeme Ronayne (1955 – 7 January 2020) was a New Zealand lawyer and jurist. He served as a District Court judge from 2013 until his death in 2020.

Born in 1955, Ronayne studied law at the University of Canterbury, and was called to the bar in 1978.

After practising briefly in Auckland, he moved to Rotorua in 1979, where he worked as a litigator at East Brewster. In 1998, Ronayne became a Crown prosecutor and founding partner in the Tauranga firm of Ronayne Hollister-Jones Lellman, and he was appointed to the bench of the District Court, based in Auckland, in 2013. From 2016, he worked on a pilot at the Auckland District Court to improve the management of serious sexual violence cases, and he was focused on ensuring that vulnerable witnesses were properly supported during the court process. While Ronayne has been lauded publicly by many, he was considered by some on the defence bar as short tempered, biased and unlikely to give quarter to even a sympathetic defendant.

Ronayne died in his home in the Auckland suburb of Remuera on 7 January 2020.
