= Bob McCullough (cricketer) =

New Zealand cricketer (1943–2020)

Personal information
- Full name: Robert Bruce McCullough
- Born: 13 June 1943; Waipawa, New Zealand
- Died: 22 March 2020 (aged 76); Lower Hutt, New Zealand
- Batting: Right handed
- Bowling: Left-arm medium

Domestic team information
- Years: Team
- 1971/72: Wellington

Career statistics
| Competition | First-class |
|---|---|
| Matches | 1 |
| Runs scored | 3 |
| Batting average | 1.50 |
| 100s/50s | 0/0 |
| Top score | 3 |
| Balls bowled | 184 |
| Wickets | 1 |
| Bowling average | 93.00 |
| 5 wickets in innings | 0 |
| 10 wickets in match | 0 |
| Best bowling | 1/63 |
| Catches/stumpings | 1/0 |
- Source: Cricinfo, 6 April 2020

Robert Bruce McCullough (13 June 1943 – 22 March 2020) was a New Zealand cricketer. He played in one first-class match for Wellington in the 1971/72 season.
