= Graham Newdick =

New Zealand cricketer (1949–2020)

Personal information
- Full name: Graham Anthony Newdick
- Born: 11 January 1949; Lower Hutt, New Zealand
- Died: 25 August 2020 (aged 71); Bromsgrove, Worcestershire, England
- Batting: Right-handed
- Bowling: Right-arm off-spin

Domestic team information
- Years: Team
- 1970/71–1980/81: Wellington

Career statistics
Competition	First-class	List A
Matches	61	20
Runs scored	3292	403
Batting average	30.48	20.15
100s/50s	4/13	0/2
Top score	143	66
Balls bowled	435	0
Wickets	5	–
Bowling average	26.80	–
5 wickets in innings	0	–
10 wickets in match	0
Best bowling	2/33	–
Catches/stumpings	20/0	3/0
- Source: Cricinfo, 28 March 2019

Graham Anthony Newdick (11 January 1949 – 25 August 2020) was a New Zealand cricketer who played first-class cricket for Wellington between 1970 and 1981.

An opening batsman, Newdick's most successful season was his first, in 1970–71. He scored 404 runs in the Plunket Shield at an average of 50.50, forming a productive opening partnership for Wellington with Bruce Murray, and hitting his highest score, 143 against Auckland. He was a consistent run-scorer for Wellington for the rest of his career. He also represented Hutt Valley in the Hawke Cup from 1968 to 1984.

Newdick worked in the construction industry, running his own companies and later playing a leading part in the construction apprenticeship body, BCITO. He was also the cricket coach at Wellington College, Wellington, and St Patrick's College, Silverstream, in Upper Hutt. He moved to England a year before his death.
