= David Halligan =

New Zealand rugby union player (1959–2020)

Dave Halligan
- Born: David Mark Halligan; 4 August 1959 Putāruru, New Zealand
- Died: 13 September 2020 (aged 61) Mount Maunganui, New Zealand
- School: King's College, Auckland
- University: University of Otago

Rugby union career
- Position: Fullback
Provincial / State sides
Years	Team	Apps	(Points)
1979–1982	Otago	43	(250)
1983	Auckland	3	(3)

David Mark Halligan (4 August 1959 – 13 September 2020) was a New Zealand first class rugby union player. He was also notable for being selected for the All Blacks but never taking the field.

Halligan attended King's College in Auckland as a boarder and was the head boy as well as captaining the first XV and cricket first XI. He also represented Auckland Secondary Schools at rugby and cricket.

He studied at the University of Otago graduating with a Bachelor of Arts in behavioural economics.

== Representative career ==
Primarily a fullback, Halligan represented Otago University at club and Otago at a provincial level.

In 1981, he was selected to play for the New Zealand national side, the All Blacks, against the touring Scottish side, but had to withdraw from the team because of injury two days before the first Test at Carisbrook. He was again selected for the All Blacks squad the following year for the three-Test series against Australia, but remained on the bench.

Playing for Otago against the 1982 Wallabies Halligan scored all the home team's 12 points through a try, a conversion, a penalty and a dropped goal in their 12-29 loss.

Halligan also represented New Zealand Universities in 1982 when they beat Wellington and Japan twice.

He later moved to Auckland and played 3 games for Auckland in 1983 before returning due to illness and to focus on his business career as a futures broker. His last game was Auckland's 13-12 victory against the British Lions.

Halligan was later a trustee of the Parenting for Men Charitable Trust. He died in Mount Maunganui on 13 September 2020, aged 61.
