= Geoff Anderson (cricketer) =

New Zealand cricketer (1939–2020)

Personal information
- Full name: Robert Geoffrey Anderson
- Born: 29 March 1939; Dunedin, New Zealand
- Died: 3 May 2020 (aged 81); Christchurch, New Zealand
- Batting: Right-handed
- Bowling: Right-arm fast-medium

Domestic team information
- Years: Team
- 1961/62–1964/65: Otago

Career statistics
Competition	First-class
Matches	16
Runs scored	307
Batting average	13.34
100s/50s	0/0
Top score	48
Balls bowled	2,593
Wickets	43
Bowling average	26.58
5 wickets in innings	0
10 wickets in match	0
Best bowling	3/29
Catches/stumpings	6/–
- Source: Cricinfo, 19 January 2021

Robert Geoffrey Anderson (29 March 1939 – 3 May 2020) was a New Zealand cricketer. He played 16 first-class matches for Otago between 1961 and 1965.

== Career ==
A right-arm fast-medium bowler, Anderson was a regular member of the Otago team for three seasons, usually opening the bowling with Frank Cameron. He took three wickets in an innings several times, with best figures of 3 for 29 in his last match, against Canterbury in 1964–65.

He was also a useful tail-end batsman, who made his highest first-class score in 1961/62 when, batting at number 10, he top-scored for Otago with 48 against Central Districts in the 1961-62 Plunket Shield.

== Personal life ==
Anderson was educated at Otago Boys' High School between 1953 and 1955 and was Otago snooker champion in 1961. He died at Christchurch Hospital on 3 May 2020.
