= Vain, Erudite and Stupid: Selected Works 1987–2005 =

Compilation album by The Dead C
- Released: 1 August 2006
- Recorded: 1987–2003
- Genre: Noise rock
- Length: 145:02
- Label: Ba Da Bing
- Producer: The Dead C

The Dead C chronology
The Damned (2003)	Vain, Erudite and Stupid: Selected Works 1987–2005 (2006)	Future Artists (2007)

Professional ratings
Review scores
Source	Rating
Pitchfork Media	7.9/10

Vain, Erudite and Stupid: Selected Works 1987–2005 is a compilation album by New Zealand noise rock band The Dead C, released on 1 August 2006 through Ba Da Bing Records.

== Track listing ==
All tracks are written by The Dead C.

Disc one
No.	Title	From the album	Length
1.	"Max Harris"	DR503 (1988)	5:35
2.	"Angel"	DR503b (1988)	6:59
3.	"3 Years"	Xpressway Pile-Up (1988)	6:21
4.	"Maggot"	Eusa Kills (1990)	7:07
5.	"Glass Hole Pit"	Eusa Kills	1:08
6.	"Helen Said This"	Helen Said This (1990)	10:58
7.	"Hell Is Now Love"	Trapdoor Fucking Exit (1991)	4:07
8.	"Highway"	Clyma est mort (1992)	0:48
9.	"Power"	Clyma est mort	7:04
10.	"Mighty"	Power (1991)	2:19
11.	"Constellation"	Harsh 70s Reality (1992)	6:41
12.	"T. Is Never Over I & II"	Harsh 70s Reality	4:03
13.	"World"	World Peace Hope et al. (1994)	7:53

Disc two
No.	Title	From the album	Length
1.	"The Marriage of Reason and Squalor"	The Operation of the Sonne (1994)	14:28
2.	"Bitcher"	The White House (1995)	6:27
3.	"Voodoo Spell"	The White House	2:16
4.	"Repent IV"	Repent (1997)	11:53
5.	"Head"	Tusk (1997)	11:03
6.	"All Channels Open"	The Dead C (2000)	6:31
7.	"Tuba Is Funny (Slight Return)"	The Dead C	7:30
8.	"Repulsion"	New Electric Music (2001)	10:38
9.	"Truth"	The Damned (2003)	3:13

== Personnel ==
- Rob Carmichael – design
- The Dead C – production, recording
- Michael Morley – instruments
- Bruce Russell – instruments
- Robbie Yeats – instruments
