= Corpus Hermeticum discography =

A discography of Corpus Hermeticum (record label).

- HERMES 001 A Handful of Dust Concord LP
- HERMES 002 A Handful of Dust The Philosophick Mercury CD +
- HERMES 003 A Handful of Dust The Eighthness Of Adam Qadmon cassette
- HERMES 004 A Handful of Dust The Seventhness lathe cut 7-inch
- HERMES 005 A Handful of Dust Musica Humana CD +
- HERMES 006 A Handful of Dust Three Dances In Honour Of Sabbatai Sevi, The Apostate Messiah lathe cut 7-inch EP
- HERMES 007 Kim Pieters / Bruce Russell / Peter Stapleton Last Glass CD
- HERMES 008 Michael Morley "Radiation" / Bruce Russell "Four Letters" lathe cut 7-inch
- HERMES 009 A Handful of Dust From A Soundtrack To The Anabase Of St. John Pierce cassette
- HERMES 010 A Handful of Dust Authority Over All Signs Of The Earth lathe cut 7-inch
- HERMES 011 Thurston Moore with Tom Surgal Klangfarbenmelodie..And The Colorist Strikes Primitiv CD
- HERMES 012 Doramaar Copula CD
- HERMES 013 A Handful of Dust Now Gods, Stand Up for Bastards CD +
- HERMES 014 Various Le Jazz Non CD
- HERMES 015 The Dead C "Metalheart" lathe cut 7-inch
- HERMES 016 Dust / Omit Deformed CD
- HERMES 017 Flying Saucer Attack F.S.A. CD (also HERMES 018)
- HERMES 019 The Shadow Ring Wax-Work Echoes CD
- HERMES 020 A Handful of Dust Topology Of A Phantom City cassette
- HERMES 021 Surface Of The Earth Surface Of The Earth CD
- HERMES 022 Alan Licht The Evan Dando Of Noise CD +
- HERMES 023 K-Group K-Group CD
- HERMES 024 Omit Quad triple CD (also HERMES 025 & 026)
- HERMES 027 Sandoz Lab Technicians Let Me Lose My Mind Gracefully CD
- HERMES 028 Kjetil D. Brandsdal Freedom - Waaoh Waaaoh CD
- HERMES 029 A Handful of Dust Urban Psychogeography, Vol II: Jerusalem, Street of Graves CD
- HERMES 030 Omit Interior Desolation CD
- HERMES 031 Matt De Gennaro & Alastair Galbraith Wire Music CD
- HERMES 032 RST Warm Planes CD
- HERMES 033 Lovely Midget Lovely Midget CD
- HERMES 034 Lionel Marchetti / Jérôme Noetinger / Mathieu Werchowski L.Marchetti/J.Noetinger/M.Werchowski CD
- HERMES 035 Bruce Russell Painting the Passports Brown CD
- HERMES 036 Tetuzi Akiyama / Taku Sugimoto / Bo Wiget Hokou CD
- HERMES 037 Birchville Cat Motel We Count These Prayers CD
- HERMES 038 Pascal Battus / Eric Cordier / Jean Luc Guionnet Pheromon: Disparture CD
- HERMES 039 Greg Malcolm Homesick for Nowhere CD
- HERMES 040 Tetuzi Akiyama / Toshimaru Nakamura / Bruce Russell International Domestic CD
- HERMES 041 Ralf Wehowsky / Bruce Russell Sights CD

+ these items are packaged with Logopandocy: The Journal of Vain Erudition

== Logopandocy: The Journal of Vain Erudition ==
Logopandocy is an occasional journal, published by the Ekskubalauron Press and edited by Bruce Russell. Issues were distributed with Corpus Hermeticum releases. Vol. 1 No.4 included Logopandocy's first letter to the editor, written by Alan Licht. Most of the Logopandocy texts, along with related material, were compiled in Bruce Russell's book Left-handed blows: writing on sound, 1993–2009 published by Clouds in 2010.

== See also ==
- Corpus Hermeticum (record label)
- Xpressway record label, also founded by Bruce Russell
- Discogs entry on Corpus Hermeticum
