= Le Jazz Non =

Compilation album by Various
- Released: 1996
- Genre: Experimental
- Label: Corpus Hermeticum

Le Jazz Non is a 1996 compilation album of music from New Zealand's 'free-noise' movement. It was released on the Corpus Hermeticum label. It was compiled by Bruce Russell in April 1996, and received funding assistance from the Arts Council of New Zealand Toi Aotearoa. The album is packaged in a hard cardboard sleeve in line with other Corpus Hermeticum releases. It contains liner notes by New Zealand music journalist Nick Cain.

In 2000 the Smalltown Supersound label from Norway released a similarly title compilation entitled Le Jazz Non: A Compilation of Norwegian Noise.

== Track listing ==
1. "To Kiss The Wall" - Gate
2. "Invisible" - Rain
3. "Witcyst Play Piano Is Spirit" - Witcyst
4. "Look Out! The Fucking Hot Jet" - Thela
5. "It's All Just" - Sandoz Lab Technicians
6. "Howsomever" - Empirical
7. "The Encompassing" - Omit
8. "Event (Edit)" - RST
9. "Acidez Max 0'4°" - Doramaar
10. "Minus Eleven" - Lame & Sorry
11. "The Kaballah Of The Horse Pegasus" - A Handful of Dust
12. "4:02" - Surface of the Earth
