= Future Artists =

Studio album by The Dead C
- Released: 19 June 2007
- Genre: Noise rock
- Length: 62:54
- Label: Ba Da Bing
- Producer: The Dead C

The Dead C chronology
Vain, Erudite and Stupid: Selected Works 1987-2005 (2006)	Future Artists (2007)	Secret Earth (2008)

Professional ratings
Review scores
Source	Rating
AllMusic	3.5/5 stars
Spin	6/10
Stylus	(B)
Uncut	3/5 stars

Future Artists is the tenth studio album by New Zealand noise rock band The Dead C, released on 19 June 2007 through Ba Da Bing Records.

== Track listing ==
All tracks are written by The Dead C

No.	Title	Length
1.	"The AMM of Punk Rock"	13:21
2.	"The Magicians"	3:45
3.	"Macoute"	8:35
4.	"Eternity"	16:58
5.	"Garage"	20:15

== Personnel ==
- The Dead C – production
- Michael Morley – instruments
- Bruce Russell – instruments
- Robbie Yeats – instruments
