= Patience (The Dead C album) =

Studio album by The Dead C
- Released: 12 October 2010
- Genre: Noise rock
- Length: 37:02
- Label: Ba Da Bing
- Producer: The Dead C

The Dead C chronology
Secret Earth (2008)	Patience (2010)	Armed Courage (2013)

Professional ratings
Review scores
Source	Rating
AllMusic	4/5 stars
Pitchfork Media	7.8/10
Uncut	4/5 stars

Patience is the twelfth studio album by New Zealand noise rock band The Dead C, released on 12 October 2010 through Ba Da Bing Records.

== Track listing ==
All tracks are written by The Dead C

No.	Title	Length
1.	"Empire"	16:10
2.	"Federation"	1:23
3.	"Shaft"	5:14
4.	"South"	14:17

== Personnel ==
- The Dead C – production
- Michael Morley – instruments
- Bruce Russell – instruments
- Robbie Yeats – instruments
