= Secret Earth =

Studio album by The Dead C
- Released: 14 October 2008
- Genre: Noise rock
- Length: 45:02
- Label: Ba Da Bing
- Producer: The Dead C

The Dead C chronology
Future Artists (2007)	Secret Earth (2008)	Patience (2010)

Professional ratings
Review scores
Source	Rating
AllMusic	2/5 stars
Spin	5/10

Secret Earth is the eleventh studio album by New Zealand noise rock band The Dead C, released on 14 October 2008 through Ba Da Bing Records.

== Track listing ==
All tracks are written by The Dead C

No.	Title	Length
1.	"Mansions"	6:59
2.	"Stations"	16:06
3.	"Plains"	9:41
4.	"Waves"	12:16

== Personnel ==
- The Dead C – production
- Michael Morley – instruments
- Bruce Russell – instruments
- Robbie Yeats – instruments
