= Repent (album) =

Live album by The Dead C
- Released: 1996
- Recorded: 1996 in New Zealand
- Genre: Noise rock
- Length: 56:58
- Label: Siltbreeze
- Producer: The Dead C

The Dead C chronology
The White House (1995)	Repent (1996)	Tusk (1997)

Professional ratings
Review scores
Source	Rating
AllMusic	2.5/5 stars

Repent is a live album by the New Zealand band The Dead C, released in 1996 through Siltbreeze.

== Track listing ==
All tracks are written by The Dead C

No.	Title	Length
1.	"I"	10:18
2.	"II"	12:31
3.	"III"	9:21
4.	"IV"	11:52
5.	"V"	4:08
6.	"VI"	8:49

== Personnel ==
- The Dead C – production
- Michael Morley – instruments
- Bruce Russell – instruments
- Robbie Yeats – instruments
