= Helen Said This =

EP by The Dead C
- Released: 1989
- Recorded: September 1989 – December 1989
- Studio: Auckland and Dunedin (New Zealand)
- Genre: Noise rock
- Length: 26:35
- Label: Siltbreeze

The Dead C chronology
Eusa Kills (1989)	Helen Said This (1989)	Trapdoor Fucking Exit (1990)

Helen Said This is an EP by The Dead C, released in 1989 by Siltbreeze. It has been compared to early Velvet Underground.

== Track listing ==
All tracks are written by The Dead C

Side one
No.	Title	Length
1.	"Helen Said This"	10:57

Side two
No.	Title	Length
1.	"Bury (Refutatio Omnium Haeresuim)"	15:38

== Personnel ==
Adapted from Helen Said This liner notes.

The Dead C

- Michael Morley – instruments
- Bruce Russell – instruments
- Robbie Yeats – instruments

== Release history ==
Region	Date	Label	Format	Catalog
New Zealand	1989	Siltbreeze	LP	SB02
