= Clyma est mort =

Live album by The Dead C
- Released: 1992
- Recorded: 1992
- Genre: Noise rock
- Length: 44:31
- Label: Siltbreeze
- Producer: The Dead C

The Dead C chronology
Harsh 70s Reality (1992)	Clyma est mort (1992)	The Operation of the Sonne (1994)

Professional ratings
Review scores
Source	Rating
Allmusic	3/5 stars

Clyma est mort is a live album by The Dead C, released in 1992 through Siltbreeze. It was recorded in front of an audience of one. The album's title is in reference to the band's recently deceased cat, and the cover references The Fall's Totale's Turns. Mary-Rose Crook of the Renderers introduces one song. The cover for the first edition of the LP was made from recycled copies of the Harsh 70s Reality sleeve.

== Track listing ==
All tracks are written by The Dead C

Side one
No.	Title	Length
1.	"Sunshine/Dirt for Harry"	11:26
2.	"Sky"	2:59
3.	"Electric"	6:50

Side two
No.	Title	Length
1.	"Power"	6:53
2.	"Highway"	0:44
3.	"Ein Kampf, ein Seig"	0:58
4.	"World"	7:22
5.	"Das Fluten, das Fluten (Oh Mama I Can't Go)"	7:19

== Personnel ==
- The Dead C – production
- Michael Morley – instruments
- Bruce Russell – instruments
- Robbie Yeats – instruments
