= This Is Not a Dream =

Studio album by Dadamah
- Released: 1992
- Genre: Experimental rock
- Length: 37:44 (vinyl edition); 61:05 (CD edition)
- Label: Majora

Professional ratings
Review scores
Source	Rating
Allmusic	4.5/5 stars

This Is Not A Dream is an album by New Zealand band Dadamah. It was originally released on vinyl by the Majora label in 1992, and later re-released on CD by Kranky label in 1995. The CD compiles the material they recorded for Majora; the original 6-track LP and two 7"s.

== Track listing ==
All lyrics are written by Peter Stapleton; all music is composed by Roy Montgomery

Side one
No.	Title	Length
1.	"Limbo Swing"	6:19
2.	"Papa Doc"	3:31
3.	"Too Hot Too Dry"	9:23

Side two
No.	Title	Length
1.	"Prove"	4:19
2.	"Brian's Children"	5:00
3.	"High Tension House"	9:09

CD issue
No.	Title	Length
7.	"Nicotine" (Nicotine/High Time 7")	4:09
8.	"High Time" (Nicotine/High Time 7")	5:22
9.	"Scratch Sun" (Scratch Sun/Radio Brain 7")	7:05
10.	"Radio Brain" (Scratch Sun/Radio Brain 7")	5:52
11.	"Replicant Emotions" (I Hear The Devil Calling Me compilation)	0:59

== Personnel ==
Adapted from the This Is Not a Dream liner notes.

Dadamah

- Roy Montgomery – guitar, vocals
- Kim Pieters – bass guitar, vocals, engineering, illustrations
- Janine Stagg – organ
- Peter Stapleton – drums

== Release history ==
Region	Date	Label	Format	Catalog
United States	1992	Majora	LP	VPAG 5750
United States	1995	Kranky	CD	KRANK 002
