= The White House (album) =

Studio album by The Dead C
- Released: 29 August 1995
- Genre: Noise rock
- Length: 47:50
- Label: Siltbreeze
- Producer: The Dead C

The Dead C chronology
World Peace Hope et al. (1994)	The White House (1995)	Repent (1996)

Professional ratings
Review scores
Source	Rating
AllMusic	4.5/5 stars

The White House is the fifth album by The Dead C, released on 29 August 1995 through Siltbreeze.

== Track listing ==
All tracks are written by The Dead C

No.	Title	Length
1.	"Voodoo Spell"	2:33
2.	"The New Snow"	12:27
3.	"Your Hand"	7:24
4.	"Aime to Prochain Comme Toi Même"	0:56
5.	"Bitcher"	6:32
6.	"Outside"	17:58

== Personnel ==
- The Dead C – production
- Michael Morley – instruments
- Bruce Russell – instruments
- Robbie Yeats – instruments
