= The Operation of the Sonne =

EP by The Dead C
- Released: 1994
- Recorded: 29 January 1993
- Studio: Empire Tavern (Dunedin, NZ)
- Genre: Noise rock
- Length: 49:23
- Label: Siltbreeze
- Producer: The Dead C

The Dead C chronology
Clyma est mort (1992)	The Operation of the Sonne (1994)	World Peace Hope et al. (1994)

Professional ratings
Review scores
Source	Rating
AllMusic	3/5 stars

The Operation of the Sonne is an album by The Dead C, released in 1994 by Siltbreeze.

== Track listing ==
All tracks are written by The Dead C

Side one
No.	Title	Length
1.	"The Marriage of Reason and Squalor"	14:28
2.	"Mordant Heaven"	10:28

Side two
No.	Title	Length
1.	"Air"	24:27

== Personnel ==
Adapted from The Operation of the Sonne liner notes.

The Dead C

- Michael Morley – instruments
- Bruce Russell – instruments
- Robbie Yeats – instruments

Production and additional personnel

- The Dead C – production
- Brent Willis – label drawing

== Release history ==
Region	Date	Label	Format	Catalog
United States	1994	Siltbreeze	LP	SB30
