= The Dead C =

New Zealand experimental rock band

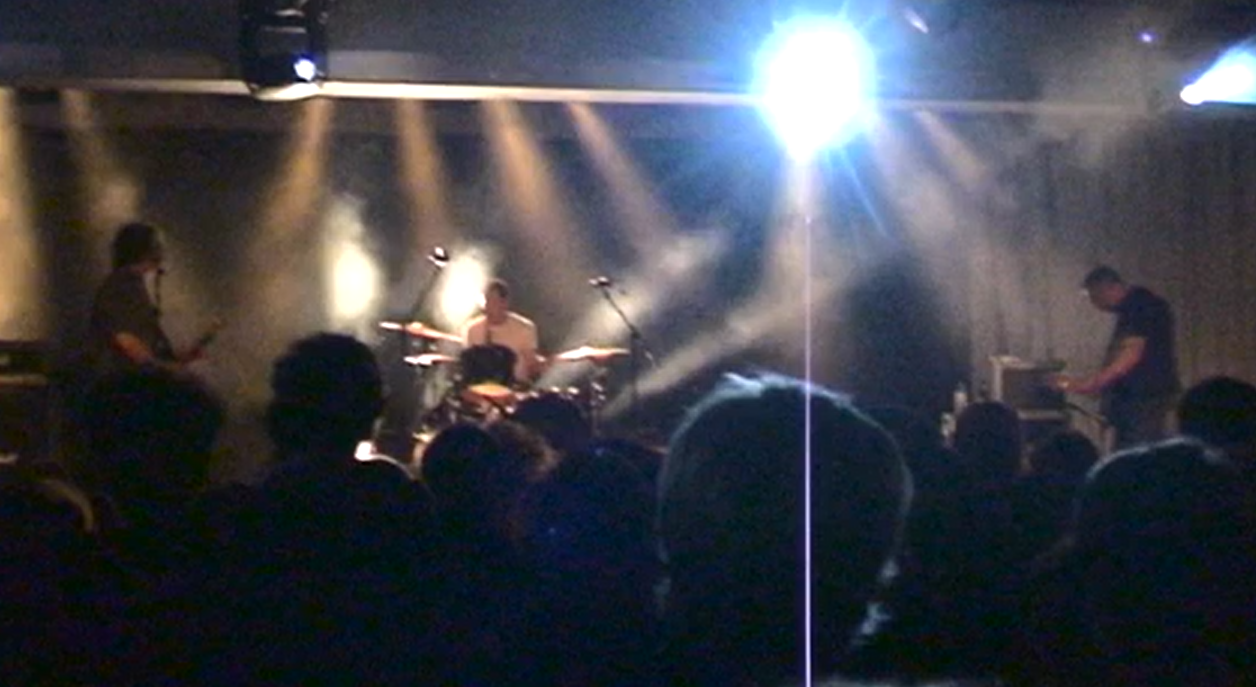
- The Dead C performing in 2010; From left: Michael Morley, Robbie Yeats, Bruce Russell

Background information
- Origin: Dunedin, New Zealand
- Genres: Experimental rock; post-rock; psychedelia; noise rock; free rock; drone; Dunedin sound
- Years active: 1986–present
- Members: Bruce Russell; Michael Morley; Robbie Yeats

The Dead C are a New Zealand music and art trio from Dunedin, consisting of members Bruce Russell (guitar/vocals), Michael Morley (guitar/vocals/laptop) and Robbie Yeats (drums).

== Overview ==
Members of The Dead C were active in the Dunedin indie rock circuit in the early '80s. In 1984, Russell and Morley became housemates and began playing music together. Following the dissolution of Morley's previous musical project, Wreck Small Speakers on Expensive Stereos, they enlisted Robbie Yeats (also of The Verlaines) on drums and formed a band.

The band's first Auckland show was in 1989, by which point they had already released two albums on Flying Nun who Russell had been doing copywriting work for. Dissatisfied with Flying Nun's increasing major-label affiliations which disincentivized it from working with underground bands, Russell formed a label, Xpressway, to release the works of The Dead C, and of other New Zealand indie acts. Between 1988 and 1992, Xpressway would put out 40 releases — mostly cassettes — for the likes of This Kind Of Punishment, The Terminals, Alastair Galbraith, The Pin Group, and Dadamah.

The Dead C became known internationally through their releases on the Philadelphia record label Siltbreeze, especially the 1992 double LP Harsh 70s Reality. The group performs infrequently outside of New Zealand, although they did travel to the US in March 2002 to perform at the All Tomorrow's Parties festival (curated by Sonic Youth), as well as shows in Los Angeles and San Francisco. They also performed for the first time in Europe in May 2004 at Le Weekend, a new music festival in Stirling, Scotland and returned to the UK to play at the All Tomorrow's Parties festival again in December 2006. In 2008, they played a short tour in the United States, and returned to the UK to play All Tomorrow's Parties in December 2010. In September 2016, they played a few US dates including Cropped Out festival in Louisville, Kentucky

A compilation album covering their first 18 years entitled Vain Erudite and Stupid: Selected Works 1987-2005 was released on the Ba Da Bing label in 2006.

== Musical style & legacy ==
The Dead C's records are typically composed of improvised material, and are not recorded in a standard professional music studio; for instance, their 2000 self-titled album was largely recorded with a digital camcorder. Around the turn of the century, The Dead C transitioned completely into free-improvisation, both for gigs and for their albums. Each member owned recording gear at home, which they would use to remotely collaborate on music. Russell describes the band's sound as "free-noise".

Andrea de Pellegrin of Ondarock has described their sound as "ranging from the Velvet Underground and Sonic Youth to the outer fringes of psychedelia (Red Crayola [sic], Angus MacLise and Dream Syndicate chief among them), from the avant-garde to free-jazz. But their spectrum also makes room for the skeletal rawness of Suicide, the spaciousness of Pink Floyd, the experimentation of Faust, and the stark reductionism of The Fall."

They have been variously praised and cited as an influence by indie rock musicians like Thurston Moore and Pavement, post-rock acts Bardo Pond, Flying Saucer Attack and Labradford, as well as avant-garde musicians Keiji Haino and Loren Mazzacane-Connors.

== Members ==
- Bruce Russell (guitar/vocals, 1987–Present)
- Michael Morley (guitar/vocals/laptop, 1987–Present)
- Robbie Yeats (drums, 1987–Present)

== Discography ==
=== Albums ===
Release date	Title	Label
1988	DR503	Flying Nun Records
1989	Eusa Kills	Flying Nun Records
1990	Trapdoor Fucking Exit	Precious Metal
1992	Harsh 70s Reality	Siltbreeze^{[a]}
1992	Clyma est mort	Siltbreeze^{[b]}
1992	Metric	Majora
1994	The Operation of the Sonne	Siltbreeze
1995	The White House	Siltbreeze
1996	Repent	Siltbreeze
1997	Tusk	Siltbreeze
2000	The Dead C	Language Recordings
2001	New Electric Music	Language Recordings
2003	The Damned	Starlight Furniture Company
2007	Future Artists	Ba Da Bing
2007	Untitled Split LP (with Hi God People)	Nervous Jerk Records
2008	Secret Earth	Ba Da Bing
2010	Patience	Ba Da Bing
2013	Armed Courage	Ba Da Bing
2016	Trouble	Ba Da Bing
2019	Rare Ravers	Ba Da Bing
2020	Unknowns	Ba Da Bing

=== EPs ===
Release date	Title	Label	Format
1989	The Sun Stabbed	Xpressway	7"
1990	Helen Said This¹	Siltbreeze	12", 33 rpm
2005	Split Series 18 (with Konono Nº1)	Nervous Jerk Records	
2013	The Dead C vs Rangda (split with Rangda)	Ba Da Bing	
2015	Palisadas	I Dischi Del Barone	
2020	All Goodbyes	Language Recordings	

=== Cassettes ===
Release date	Title	Label
1987	The Dead See Perform M. Harris	Diabolic Root
1987	43 Sketch for a Poster	Diabolic Root
1988	The Live Dead See	Xpressway
1989	Perform DR503B	Xpressway
1990	Runway	Precious Metal

=== Compilations ===
Release date	Title	Label
1995	World Peace Hope et al.	Shock
2006	Vain, Erudite and Stupid: Selected Works 1987–2005	Ba Da Bing

Notes
^{a} 1500 copies made
^{b} 450 copies made

=== Singles ===
Year	Single
1991	"Hell is Now Love/Bone"
1991	"Power/Mighty/Peace"
1994	"The Dead C vs. Sebadoh"
1994	"Metalheart"
1995	"Metalheart" (reissue)
2000	"Stealth/The Factory"
2006	"Relax Fallujah Hell Has Come"
2008	"Golden/Canine"
