= The Cooler (night club) =

Night club

Coordinates: 40.741346°N 74.006352°W

The Cooler, a music and performance space, opened on Wednesday, September 22, 1993, at 416 West 14th Street in the Meatpacking District in Manhattan. The club showcased a wide variety of experimental music, Americana music, roots music, and spoken-word performers. Performances at The Cooler also included dance, film and video arts, and club parties. The Cooler blended live music, DJs, turntablists, and electronic dance music (EDM).

The Cooler's early period featured many mixed-genre downtown New York City musicians and DJs. The late period incorporated fewer bands and booked more EDM, mixologists and electronic music. The club closed on June 2, 2001, with a performance by Michael Karoli of Can, Botanica, Jim Thirlwell, James Chance and Suicide.

== Early days ==
In the last three months of 1993 and early 1994, The Cooler shows featured New York City percussionists Milton Cardona, Mino Cinelu, Gato Nego, Patato Valdez, Manolo Badrena, Sammy Figueroa, Juju House as well as performances by Chocolate Armenteros, Gnawan musicians Hassan Hakmoun and Brahim Fribgane. Early DJs and mixologists included DJ Olive, Raz Mesinai, DJ Spooky, Skizz Fernando, Mixmaster Morris, DJ Logic, Soulslinger, Kurtis Mantronik, Swinsett, DJ Wally and UK Apache.

== Golden years ==
=== 1994–1995 ===
Many diverse shows were performed early in 1994, with Medeski Martin & Wood, The Fugees and Autechre playing on three consecutive nights in early March. Gil Scott Heron, Amiri Baraka, Reggie Workman, Arto Lindsay, Patato Valdez, John Lurie, Papa Jube, Dewey Redman, Gunter Hampel, David Tronzo, Rubén Blades and Ronald Shannon Jackson all performed during this period.

In June 1994 Marc Ribot curated a month of Mondays with "the Wah's Duo", Shrek and Anthony Coleman's "The Hunger". The Cooler's September Artist register read as follows: Jessamine, Cibo Matto, Cake Like, Silkworm, The August Sons, Thurston Moore & Derek Bailey, Alex Chilton, Circle X, Billy Bang, The Roots, Lunachicks, Guv'ner, Carbon, Ben Neill, Medeski Martin & Wood, The Chrome Cranks, Demi Semi Quaver, DJ Olive, DJ Spooky with Danny Blume and Ben Perowsky doing Monday nights. October followed with Monday nites produced by Lee Ranaldo with the finale Halloween show with Lee, Rasputina, William Hooker & Zeena Parkins and Motherhead Bug. In the month of November, Shrek, Versus, Cell, and Ruby Falls all performed. Cat Power played two shows, one with Run On and the other with Congo Norvell. 1994 New Year's show featured Kehinde O'Uhuru, Sun Ra Arkestra and Vernon Reid's Masque.

Jam bands, Jamaican, Hip hop, EDM and jungle/drum and bass played The Cooler in late 1994 early 1995. Artist bills included Charlie Hunter, The Fugees, Soul Coughing, MMW, Trouble Funk, WE, Ben Neill, The Slackers, SubDub, Busta Rhymes, Soulive, and Skavoovie & The Epitones. DJs featured include DJ Stretch Armstrong, Soulslinger, and DJs Delmar, Cassien, Honeychild, Gunsmoke, Wordsound and Uk Apache. Giant Step produced many Thursdays at this time, including the debut Fugee's acoustic show. Mat E Silver presented Abyss Parties, then Chiaroscuro with DJ Olive & DJ Spooky in mid-1994. Roxanne Semadeni curated hoofer shows at this time as well with Tina Pratt, Gregory Hines, Buster Brown, Lon Chaney, Jimmy Slyde and Savion Glover.

In January 1995, Screaming Headless Torsos did a benefit show for Sarajevo, Christian Marclay played with Tong, Liquid Sky started "The Egg" Party and Ska/Hardcore band Mephiskapheles headlined on January 20. Monday nights in February were curated by Elliott Sharp with Carbon, Zeena Parkins, Melvin Gibbs and Rebecca Moore. In March 1995, Steve Shelley of Sonic Youth curated a month of Mondays with Male Slut, The Rock*A*Teens, Chan Marshall, Loren Mazzacane Connors and Dirty Three's American debut. Discord and DC bands Slant 6, The Warmers, Ted Leo's Chisel and Make-Up were seen on weekends as well as Baltimore's Candy Machine, Railroad Jerk and Jonathan Fireater. John Zorn performed in mid 1995 with performances of Pueblo and Masada and the "Free Mumia" show on August 9 billed Allen Ginsberg with Marc Ribot, Amiri and Amina Baraka, Bern Nix, William Parker and Roy Campbell.

Other Monday nights in 1995 featured Spanish Fly, David Shea, Gary Lucas, Christian Marclay, Chocolate Genius, Douce Gimlet, Beekeeper, Cat Power, William Hooker, White Out, Rudolph Grey, Ram Umbus, Smoke, Sleepyhead, Maggie Estep, Queen Esther, Two Dollar Guitar, Harvey Sid Fisher and No-Neck Blues Band. On Friday and Saturday June 2 & 3, there was a Wall To Wall tribute to Rahsaan Roland Kirk, and in the fall and winter of 1995 saw Rasputina, Smog, Unsane, Bardo Pond, Demi Semi Quaver, Debbie Harry, Last Poets, Lungfish, and Ian Svenonius' Famous Monsters Revue. A December 29 post-Christmas bash featured UI, Zeit, Labradford, Alec Empire, Trans Am and Tortoise. Finishing off the year for New Year's were The Fort Apache band, Rashied Ali, William Parker, Amiri Baraka, Charles Gayle and Tortoise on New Year's Eve, 1995.

=== 1996–1997 ===
February 1996, saw Sugar Minott, Lungfish, Graham Haynes and Charles Gayle. On March 8 and 9, 1996, The Cooler hosted a D.C. Funk/Punk weekend featuring Chuck Brown and the Make-Up. Throughout 1996, Guest artists included Rasputina, Labradford, Blonde Redhead, Bush Tetras, Sulfur, Cake Like, The Monorchid, Congo Norvel, The Spitters, Bloodloss and other weekend shows with Roy Ayers, Prince Paul, Hassan Hakmoun, Los Cubano Postisos, Mephiskapheles, Princess Superstar, James Chance, The Last Poets, and Amiri Baraka. On November 8, 1996, Thurston Moore and Male Slut previewed his Psychic Hearts record. In December 1996, Vernon Reid did two shows: My Science Project with Christina Wheeler and Vernon Reid's Encryption Society with Bernie Worrell's Woo Warriors on New Year's Eve.

In January 1997 The Cooler hosted Gary Lucas, Ben Neill and Peter Brötzmann and the Sergey Kuryokhin FESTIVAL with Auctyon and Kvost. February included Marc Ribot, Bashir Atar, Vernon Reid, David Tronzo, and Don Byron and the month ending with another chapter of Ian Svenonius' Famous Monsters Revue. On March 1 and 2, 1997, Sonic Youth did a pair of club dates with openers, Ruins and Dim Sum Clip Job. The mid-year period of 1997 featured T-Model Ford, Majek Fashek, Cold Cold Hearts, Unwound, Jeff Pinkus, Oliver Lake, Arto Lindsay's Hypercivilizado, Smoke, and North Mississippi Allstars. October 3 and 4, 1997 saw a shared Thurston Moore & Cecil Taylor bill with them playing together on Saturday, October 4. On the October 24–25 weekend Two Dollar Guitar, Friends of Dean Martinez and Los Cubanos Postisos played. November 1997 featured Khan, Lary 7, Circuit Bible, and The Cranium, Windsor for the Derby. San Francisco's Thinking Fellars Union hosted the November 14 and 15 with openers Silver Apples, The Tower Recordings, and Danielson Family.

Other dub, EDM, hip hop and turntablist acts in the 1996–1997 period included Mad Professor, Amon Tobin, WE, Mutamasik, DJ Spooky, Cut Chemist, X-Men, DJ Logic, DJ Olive, Raz Mesinai, Toshio, Alec Empire, SubDub, Circuit Bible, Rome, Afrika Bambaataa, Sir Coxsone Dodd, The Slackers, The Last Poets and a Guy called Gerald. Club Parties of this period were Night of the Living Dub, Koncrete Jungle, Funk Hut, and Khan's Killer. The Cooler's 1997 New Year's show which included Baktun (The Cooler's sister club upstairs) as well, headlined Alec Empire, Mad Professor, WE, Silver Apples, and DJs Wally & Swingsett.

== Digital era ==
=== 1998–1999 ===
The spring and winter of 1998 saw Cat Power, RL Burnside, Deerhoof, The Spitters, Black Eyed Peas, Xzibit, The Contortions, To Rococo Rot and Godspeed You Black Emperor. EDM bookings included Talvin Singh, Alec Empire, Bhom Shankar, WE, Scarab, Quantyk, Blackalicious, Junkie XL, Silver Apples and DJs Rekha, Sage, Tony Touch and Spooky.

On May 4th, 1998, Thurston Moore/ Ecstatic Yod presented Sandy Bull, Roy Montgomery, Godspeed You! Black Emperor, Lee Ranaldo-William Hooker Duo and Tower Recordings. Other Cooler shows included Royal Trux on September 11 and 12, Beck and Thurston Moore on September 21 and Michael Karoli and Damo Suzuki of Can on the following weekend. October shows saw the first Original Silver Apples show in 28 years, Michael Rother of Neu & Dieter Moebius with We, Philadelphia's Strapping Fieldhands and The Cranium, Rondelles and Make-Up finishing off the month. The first week of November included Eminem in one of his first N.Y. shows, the Dust Brothers, Thee Headcoats and ? and The Mysterians. Featured Club parties in 1998 were Mutiny, The Lyricist Lounge, Koncrete Jungle and Ghetto Roots.

1999 got its start with Antibalas, Dubster's UV RAY, Ninjatune's DJ Vadim, Afrika Bambaataa and Baltic rockers Gogol Bordello. Harvey Sid Fisher sang astrology songs on February 8 on the Monday Nite Series. March featured Sonny Fortune / Rashied Ali Duo, Dj Prince Paul, Grand Wizzard Theodore, Kid, Knoxville Girls and anti-Pop Consortium. Performances in April, May, and June presented Dieselboy, Vernon Reid and Suphala, A Guy Called Gerald, Pansonic, Acid Mothers Temple, Riz Maselen, Eszter Balint, Mocean Worker, Easy Allstars, and The Ruby Dare.

On September 11, The Cooler featured The Real Kids who opened for cult soulster Andre Williams and The Sadies as well as later in the month a show featuring Panacea, Stewart Walker and DJ Godfather. October billings featured Ben Neill and Si*Sé, Mutamasik, Cheb I Sabbah, and Banco de Gaia and a later show with Challenge of the Future, Heroine Sheiks and The Special Pillow. At the end of the month and Don Fleming and Thurston Moore played a show with members of Godspeed and The annual Halloween show featured T-Model Ford, Knoxville Girls, Kid Congo Powers, and James Chance. November Special shows were; November 6: Rob Swift and Mista Sinasta of The Executioners; November 22: Ted Leo and the Pharmacists, Pine Barons and Holly Golightly; November 27: Ninja Tune/ Giant Step event with DJ Vadim, Mr Thing and Killer Kela. The year ended with Interpol on December 4. Thurston Moore & Rashied Ali with The Tower Recordings and Calla on December 11 and the millennium New Year's show with Gil Scott Heron and Roy Ayers Ubiquity. Club Parties in 1999 featured Koncrete Jungle, Liquid Sky, Direct Drive, Blue Groove, Mutiny, The Bounce and Salga.

=== 2000 ===
In early 2000, The Cooler and many downtown music venues had numerous problems with "the Dance Police" who were trying to accommodate Mayor Giuliani's vision of the "Cabaret Law" and this altered operating potential and programming. As a result, The Cooler went into an abbreviated schedule at this time. In early 2000, Bristol Trip-Hoppers Smith & Mighty and DJ Franco's Vampyros Lesbos played. On Friday, February 11, Prince Paul played.

The club went onward with an Augustus Pablo Tribute with Easy All-Stars, Delroy Williams and Black Redemption on February 19 and other winter shows. Spring shows included the following: March 3: We, A Guy Called Gerald and Ben Neill. March 29: Stereo MCs. April featured Soulman Lee Fields with the Soul Providers and Mighty Imperials. On May 3 there was a Friends of Dean Martinez record release and on May 13 Bardo Pond played with Christian Marclay and Lee Ranaldo and DJ Olive. On Saturday May 27, The Cooler hosted Robin Williamson from the Incredible String Band with Strapping Fieldhands and the Tower Recordings. Other notable 2000 shows were as follows: June 3: Mad Scene, Shell, Cul de Sac. June 17: Hassan Hakmoun Zahar and David Fiuczynski's Kif. August 8: Dele Sosimi of Egypt 80 and Antibalas. September 9: Antipop Consortium, Princess Superstar and Mista Sinasta. September 15: Cornell Campbell and the Slackers. October 7: Kitty and the Tree and The Strokes. October 20: Oneida, Danielson Family, Grant Hart (Hüsker Dü). October 21: The Swirlies, Brian Jonestown Massacre November 3: UV Ray, WE and Badawi. November 14: DJ Assault and Detroit Grand Pubahs, December 9: The Walkmen, Don Fleming and Poem Rocket. December 16: Reverend Vince Anderson, Moisturizer and Andre Williams & The Strapp and December 30: Electro-Putas, Pansonic, Lary 7 and Nicolas.

== Closure ==
The club moved on to January 12 with alternative hip-hoppers Antipop Consortium and Dujeous with Total Eclipse. James Blood Ulmer, Rashied Ali and Reggie Workman played on the January 19, and a night of Sound, Words and Angus MacLise Tapes with Gerard Malanga, DJ Olive, Thurston Moore, Christian Marclay, Lee Ranaldo and Hrvatski finished the month off on January 27. On February 9, Lighting Bolt jammed on the floor following other stage acts Oneida and The Walkmen. Other shows in February were Dr Israel and UV Ray, DJ Rekha's Mutiny party and James Chance with the original Contortions.

March highlights were Rashied Ali & James Blood Ulmer Duo with openers Arthur Doyle and Charles Gayle, and on Saturday, March 31, one of the first Yeah Yeah Yeahs shows ever with them opening for Wharton Tiers Ensemble. April brought The Mad Scene, Mad Professor, Jim O'Rourke, 2 Dollar Guitar and T. Moore. and a wildly sold-out tribute to French singer Serge Gainsbourg hosted by Congo Norvell. In The Cooler's final days, on Saturday May 12, Jim Carroll played with Lenny Kaye with the openers: The Secret Machines and Lee Ranaldo. The Frogs, Stereobate, and The Rapture were featured on May 19 and in one of the last Monday Nites Billy Bang and William Parker played. The finale weekend shows June 1 and 2 presented Michael Karoli, Botanica, DJ Olive, DJ Otefsu aka Jim Thirlwell, Lary 7 and Suicide.

== Monday night series ==
Jedi, the proprietor and curator of The Cooler, created the Artist Curated Monday Nite Series. He enlisted New York City Artists to curate a month of Monday Nites. Monday Nite Curators included Rashied Ali, Steve Shelley, Elliott Sharp, Zeena Parkins, Marc Ribot, Lee Ranaldo, David Fiuczynski, Rick Brown, Homestead Records, Marc Ashwill, Thurston Moore, William Parker, Billy Bang and many Others. Acts featured on the Monday Nite Series included Cat Power, Dirty Three, Make-Up, Sandy Bull, Blonde Redhead, Elliott Smith, Ira Cohen, Charles Gayle, Beck, Rashied Ali, Arthur Doyle and Motherhead Bug. Monday Nite patrons included well known celebrities, including David Byrne, Penn Jillette, Rashied Ali, Cecil Taylor, Gerard Malanga, Raz Mesinai, Dennis Oppenheim and John Paul Dejoria.

== Club parties ==
Club parties were a significant portion of The Cooler programming. Early parties included Liquid Sky, Giant Step, Night of the Living Dub, Chatterbox Lounge, Matt E Silvers Abyss, Khan's Killer and James Chance's Molotov Cocktail Lounge and the Funk Hut. The latter parties featured DJ Rekha's Mutiny Asian Underground Drum n Bass night, Koncrete Jungle, The Lyricist Lounge, Ghetto Roots, SoundLab, The Egg, Vampyros Lesbos, Direct Drive and The Bounce.
