= Harsh 70s Reality =

1992 studio album by The Dead C

Studio album by The Dead C
- Released: 1992
- Recorded: December 1989 – September 1991
- Genre: Noise rock
- Length: 81:10
- Label: Siltbreeze
- Producer: The Dead C

The Dead C chronology
| Trapdoor Fucking Exit (1990) | Harsh 70s Reality (1992) | Clyma est mort (1992) |

Professional ratings
Review scores
| Source | Rating |
|---|---|
| AllMusic | 4.5/5 stars |
| Pitchfork | 8.7/10 |

Harsh 70s Reality is the fourth studio album by The Dead C, released in 1992 by Siltbreeze.

The opening track "Driver U.F.O." is performed over a recording of Douglas Lilburn's "Poem in Time of War". Side two closer "Suffer Bomb Damage" is a homage to the This Heat recording "Suffer Bomb Disease". Stephen Malkmus of the rock band Pavement has cited the record as one of his top 10 all-time favourite albums.

== Track listing ==
All tracks are written by The Dead C.

Side one
| No. | Title | Length |
|---|---|---|
| 1. | "Driver U.F.O." | 22:23 |

Side two
| No. | Title | Length |
|---|---|---|
| 1. | "Sky" | 3:38 |
| 2. | "Love" | 11:51 |
| 3. | "Suffer Bomb Damage" | 3:40 |

Side three
| No. | Title | Length |
|---|---|---|
| 1. | "Sea Is Violet" | 7:57 |
| 2. | "Shark" | 4:55 |
| 3. | "Constellation" | 6:43 |

Side four
| No. | Title | Length |
|---|---|---|
| 1. | "T. Is Never Over I & II" | 4:00 |
| 2. | "Baseheart" | 6:53 |
| 3. | "Hope" | 9:23 |

CD issue track listing
| No. | Title | Length |
|---|---|---|
| 1. | "Driver U.F.O." | 22:23 |
| 2. | "Sky" | 3:38 |
| 3. | "Love" | 11:51 |
| 4. | "Suffer Bomb Damage" | 3:40 |
| 5. | "Sea Is Violet" | 7:57 |
| 6. | "Constellation" | 6:43 |
| 7. | "Baseheart" | 6:53 |
| 8. | "Hope" | 9:23 |

== Personnel ==
Adapted from Harsh 70s Reality liner notes.

The Dead C

- Michael Morley – guitar, bass guitar, keyboards, turntables, drums, vocals
- Bruce Russell – guitar, organ, drums, tape, vocals
- Robbie Yeats – drums, guitar, vocals

Additional musicians

- Joan George – vocals (C2)
- Buffy O'Reilly – guitar (A)

Production and additional personnel

- The Dead C – production, mixing

== Release history ==
Release history and formats for Harsh 70s Reality
| Region | Date | Label | Format | Catalog |
|---|---|---|---|---|
| United States | 1992 | Siltbreeze | LP | SB11/12 |
| United States | 1995 | Siltbreeze | CD | SB11/12 |
| United States | 2012 | Siltbreeze | LP | SB11/12 |
