= AHOD =

AHOD may refer to:

- A Handful of Dust, a novel by Evelyn Waugh published in 1934
- A Handful of Dust (band), a New Zealand band
