= DR503 =

Studio album by Dead C.
- Released: May 1988
- Recorded: February 1987 – June 1987
- Studio: Radio 1 (New Zealand)
- Genre: Noise rock
- Length: 39:08
- Label: Flying Nun
- Producer: Richard Steele, Michael Stoodley

Dead C. chronology
DR503 (1988)	Eusa Kills (1989)

Professional ratings
Review scores
Source	Rating
AllMusic	2.5/5 stars
Spin Alternative Record Guide	8/10

DR503 is the debut studio album by Dead C., released in 1988 by Flying Nun Records.

== Track listing ==
All tracks are written by Dead C.

Side one
No.	Title	Length
1.	"Max Harris"	5:27
2.	"Speed Kills"	4:29
3.	"The Wheel"	4:45
4.	"3 Years"	4:50

Side two
No.	Title	Length
1.	"Mutterline"	6:20
2.	"Country"	1:16
3.	"I Love This"	3:09
4.	"Polio"	8:52

CD issue
No.	Title	Length
9.	"Max Harris 2"	13:36

== Personnel ==
Adapted from DR503 liner notes.

Dead C.

- Michael Morley – instruments
- Bruce Russell – instruments
- Robbie Yeats – instruments

Production and additional personnel

- Richard Steele – production, engineering
- Michael Stoodley – production, engineering

== Release history ==
Region	Date	Label	Format	Catalog
New Zealand	1988	Flying Nun	LP	FN092
United States	1992	Feel Good All Over	CD	FGAO #7
United States	2008	Ba Da Bing	LP	BING-060
