= A Handful of Dust (disambiguation) =

A Handful of Dust may refer to:

- A Handful of Dust, a novel by British writer Evelyn Waugh
  - A Handful of Dust (film), a 1988 film based on the novel
- A Handful of Dust (band), a New Zealand free noise band
- "A Handful of Dust", a 1989 song by Spandau Ballet, from the album Heart Like a Sky
- "A Handful of Dust", a song written by Tony Arata, recorded by Patty Loveless, which appears on her 1994 album, When Fallen Angels Fly
