= The Damned (album) =

Studio album by The Dead C
- Released: 11 November 2003
- Recorded: 2001–2003 at My Pit P.C. and The Driving Range, Dunedin, New Zealand
- Genre: Noise rock
- Length: 44:43
- Label: Starlight Furniture Co.
- Producer: The Dead C

The Dead C chronology
New Electric Music (2002)	The Damned (2003)	Vain, Erudite and Stupid: Selected Works 1987-2005 (2006)

Professional ratings
Review scores
Source	Rating
Allmusic	3/5 stars

The Damned is the ninth album by New Zealand noise rock band The Dead C, released on 11 November 2003 through Starlight Furniture Co..

== Track listing ==
All tracks are written by The Dead C

No.	Title	Length
1.	"Truth"	3:17
2.	"Atmosphere"	5:36
3.	"Holy"	8:52
4.	"Heat"	5:11
5.	"The Provider"	18:16
6.	"Casino"	3:31

== Personnel ==
- The Dead C – production
- Michael Morley – instruments
- Bruce Russell – instruments
- Robbie Yeats – instruments
- Nathan Thompson – instruments
- James Kirk – instruments
