= Tusk (The Dead C album) =

Studio album by The Dead C
- Released: 29 July 1997
- Genre: Noise rock
- Length: 48:15
- Label: Siltbreeze
- Producer: The Dead C

The Dead C chronology
Repent (1996)	Tusk (1997)	The Dead C (2000)

Professional ratings
Review scores
Source	Rating
AllMusic	4.5/5 stars

Tusk is the sixth album by the New Zealand noise rock band the Dead C, released in 1997 through Siltbreeze. Many of its songs were edited and trimmed from longer jams.

== Critical reception ==
The Sunday Times wrote: "On the 11-minute 'Head' and the similarly expansive title track, simple riffs are pounded out by the usual guitar, bass and drums line-up, but the Dead C steer an identifiably structured course through the sort of freeform feedback most bands of the ilk would simply surrender to."

== Track listing ==
All tracks are written by The Dead C

No.	Title	Length
1.	"Plane"	11:10
2.	"Head"	10:55
3.	"Tuba"	1:25
4.	"Half"	5:15
5.	"Imaginary"	7:35
6.	"Tusk"	11:55

== Personnel ==
- The Dead C – production, mixing
- Michael Morley – guitar, synthesizer, vocals
- Bruce Russell – guitar, synthesizer
- Robbie Yeats – drums, guitar, synthesizer
