= Trapdoor Fucking Exit =

Studio album by The Dead C
- Released: 1990
- Recorded: December 1989 – January 1990
- Studio: My Pit P.C. (New Zealand)
- Genre: Noise rock, garage punk
- Length: 63:32
- Label: Precious Metal

The Dead C chronology
Helen Said This (1989)	Trapdoor Fucking Exit (1990)	Harsh 70s Reality (1992)

Professional ratings
Review scores
Source	Rating
Allmusic	4/5 stars

Trapdoor Fucking Exit is the third studio album by The Dead C, released in 1990 through Precious Metal.

== Legacy ==
In 1998, The Wire included Trapdoor Fucking Exit in their list of "100 Records That Set the World on Fire (While No One Was Listening)". The staff described the album as "the sound of three newly freed New Zealanders wrestling with the implications of punk-primitive aesthetics in the wake of US/Euro free jazz ground leveling. Two broken guitars and a rapid-firing drummer, playing lead, singlehandedly redefined the concept of garage punk without any considerations of melody, rhythm or fidelity."

== Track listing ==
All tracks are written by The Dead C

Side one
No.	Title	Length
1.	"Heaven"	6:40
2.	"Hell Is Now Love"	2:14
3.	"Mighty"	5:37
4.	"Power"	4:30
5.	"Bury"	3:16
6.	"Bury (Refutatio Omnium Haeresium)"	15:39

Side two
No.	Title	Length
7.	"Sky"	2:51
8.	"Bone"	2:36
9.	"Krossed"	6:29
10.	"Calling Slowly"	2:49
11.	"Helen Said This"	10:57

CD issue
No.	Title	Length
12.	"Power"	2:17
13.	"Bone"	1:45
14.	"Mighty"	1:49

== Personnel ==
Adapted from Trapdoor Fucking Exit liner notes.

The Dead C

- Michael Morley – guitar, vocals
- Bruce Russell – guitar, drums
- Robbie Yeats – drums, guitar

Additional musicians

- Chris Heazlewood – additional guitar (3, 4, 7–10)

== Release history ==
Region	Date	Label	Format	Catalog
New Zealand	1990	Precious Metal	CS	PM 4
United States	1993	Siltbreeze	CD	SB21
