= Eusa Kills =

Studio album by The Dead C
- Released: 1989
- Recorded: December 1988 – March 1989
- Studio: Studio Thirteen, My Pit, and Grey St. (New Zealand)
- Genre: Noise rock
- Length: 35:14
- Label: Flying Nun

The Dead C chronology
DR503 (1988)	Eusa Kills (1989)	Helen Said This (1989)

Professional ratings
Review scores
Source	Rating
Allmusic	3.5/5 stars

Eusa Kills is the second studio album by The Dead C, released in 1989 by Flying Nun Records.

== Track listing ==
All tracks are written by The Dead C, except "Children" by Marc Bolan

Side one
No.	Title	Length
1.	"Scary Nest"	2:43
2.	"Call Back Your Dogs"	0:38
3.	"Alien to Be"	2:50
4.	"Phantom Power"	6:09
5.	"Now I Fall"	3:37
6.	"I Was Here"	1:49

Side two
No.	Title	Length
1.	"Children"	3:33
2.	"Bumtoe"	3:32
3.	"Glasshole Pit"	1:05
4.	"Maggot"	7:01
5.	"Envelopment"	2:17

== Personnel ==
Adapted from Eusa Kills liner notes.

The Dead C

- Michael Morley – guitar, vocals
- Bruce Russell – guitar, vocals
- Robbie Yeats – drums

== Release history ==
Region	Date	Label	Format	Catalog
New Zealand	1989	Flying Nun	LP	FN130
New Zealand	1992	Flying Nun	CD	FN130
United States	2008	Ba Da Bing	LP	BING-061
