= Flies Inside the Sun =

New Zealand band

- Origin: New Zealand
- Years active: 1993–1995, 1997–2004
- Members: Kim Pieters; Peter Stapleton; Danny Butt; Brian Crook

Flies Inside the Sun were a band from New Zealand. They formed in 1993, and consisted of Kim Pieters, Peter Stapleton, Danny Butt, and Brian Crook. They were part of a prominent improvisation / noise scene which was active in New Zealand at the time, documented in magazines such as Opprobrium and compilations such as Le Jazz Non. Pieters and Stapleton had been members of the recently disbanded Dadamah along with Roy Montgomery. Their debut album, An Audience of Others (Including Herself), was released on the Kranky label in 1995. They disbanded when Brian Crook left to focus on his other project, The Renderers. They reformed in 1997 and released a self titled album on Stapleton's own Metonymic label. This was followed by a string of releases on the Metonymic label.

== Discography ==
Release date	Title	Label	Charted	Country	Catalog number
1995	An Audience of Others (Including Herself)	Kranky	-	-	
1997	Flies Inside the Sun	Metonymic	-	-	
1999	Le Mal D'Archive	Metonymic	-	-	
2000	Cactus Sky	Metonymic	-	-	
2004	Burning Glass	Metonymic	-	-	
