= World Peace Hope et al. =

Compilation album by The Dead C
- Released: 1994
- Genre: Noise rock
- Length: 63:52
- Label: Shock
- Producer: The Dead C

The Dead C chronology
The Operation of the Sonne (1994)	World Peace Hope et al. (1994)	The White House (1995)

Professional ratings
Review scores
Source	Rating
AllMusic	3/5 stars

World Peace Hope et al. is a compilation by The Dead C, released in 1994 through Shock Records.

== Track listing ==
All tracks are written by The Dead C

No.	Title	Length
1.	"Stars"	6:33
2.	"Sun Stabbed" (edit)	1:37
3.	"Angel"	7:10
4.	"Abschied"	0:51
5.	"Fire"	3:59
6.	"Puberty"	0:36
7.	"Helen"	7:28
8.	"Speed Kills"	6:41
9.	"This Map"	0:43
10.	"Communication With Heaven"	1:13
11.	"Sea Is Violet"	5:51
12.	"World"	7:58
13.	"Peace"	2:13
14.	"Hope"	10:59

== Personnel ==
The Dead C

- Michael Morley – instruments
- Bruce Russell – instruments
- Robbie Yeats – instruments

Production and additional personnel

- Denis Blackham – mastering
- The Dead C – production
- Alastair Galbraith – violin on "Abschied"
- John Harvey – sampler on "Helen"
- Peter Jefferies – engineering on "Sun Stabbed" and "Fire"
- Stephen Kilroy – mastering
- Graham Lambkin – illustrations
