= New Electric Music =

Studio album by The Dead C
- Released: 2002
- Recorded: 18 September 1999–24 October 2000 at My Pit P.C., The Driving Range, Electric Heaven and Sammy's Dumps, New Zealand
- Genre: Noise rock
- Length: 64:25
- Label: Language Recordings
- Producer: The Dead C

The Dead C chronology
The Dead C (2000)	New Electric Music (2002)	The Damned (2003)

Professional ratings
Review scores
Source	Rating
Allmusic	4/5 stars

New Electric Music is the eighth album by New Zealand noise rock band The Dead C, released in 2002 through Language Recordings.

== Track listing ==
All tracks are written by The Dead C

No.	Title	Length
1.	"Killer"	6:00
2.	"Hush"	8:48
3.	"Repulsion"	10:36
4.	"Stand"	7:56
5.	"Forever"	30:55

== Personnel ==
- The Dead C – production
- Michael Morley – instruments
- Bruce Russell – instruments
- Robbie Yeats – instruments
