= The Dead C (album) =

Studio album by The Dead C
- Released: 2000
- Recorded: 12 December 1995–22 August 1999 at My Pit P.C., New Zealand
- Genre: Noise rock
- Length: 128:53
- Label: Language Recordings
- Producer: The Dead C

The Dead C chronology
Tusk (1997)	The Dead C (2000)	New Electric Music (2002)

Professional ratings
Review scores
Source	Rating
Allmusic	4/5 stars

The Dead C is the eponymously titled seventh album by New Zealand noise rock band The Dead C. It was a double CD set released in 2000 on the band's own Language Recordings imprint.

== Track listing ==
All tracks are written by The Dead C.

Disc one
No.	Title	Length
1.	"Accelerate"	1:23
2.	"Dec"	8:02
3.	"Pussyfooting"	12:30
4.	"Speederbot"	33:06
5.	"All Channels Open"	6:35

Disc two
No.	Title	Length
1.	"One Night"	5:31
2.	"Realisation Con Slider"	3:47
3.	"Fake Electronics"	12:14
4.	"Tuba Is Funny (Slight Return)"	7:30
5.	"Drillbit"	13:51
6.	"High Original"	9:05
7.	"Tidewater"	15:19

== Accolades ==
Year	Publication	Country	Accolade	Rank
2000	The Wire	United Kingdom	"Albums of the Year"	4
"*" denotes an unordered list.

== Personnel ==
- The Dead C – production, recording
- Michael Morley – guitar, sampler, synthesizer
- Bruce Russell – guitar, tape
- Robbie Yeats – drums, guitar, synthesizer
