= Minor Shadows =

Studio album by 1 Mile North
- Released: 2003
- Genre: Electronica, Experimental
- Label: Ba Da Bing
- Producer: Jon Hills; Mark Bajuk

1 Mile North chronology
Glass Wars (2001)	Minor Shadows (2003)	Altare Della Patria: Home and Concert Recordings 2000-2003 (2004)

Professional ratings
Review scores
Source	Rating
Pitchfork Media	9.0/10

Minor Shadows is the second album by experimental electronic group 1 Mile North. It was released in 2003 by Ba Da Bing Records.

== Track listing ==
1. "In 1983 He Loved To Fly"
2. "Life Indoors"
3. "Return To From Where We Came"
4. "The Sick"
5. "Black Lines"
6. "August 8:15"
7. "The Manual"
