= Le Jazz Non: A Compilation of Norwegian Noise =

Compilation album by Various
- Released: 1999
- Genre: Experimental
- Length: 1hr 11min
- Label: Smalltown Supersound

Le Jazz Non: A Compilation of Norwegian Noise is a compilation album of experimental Norwegian music, released on the Smalltown Supersound label in 1999. The album acts as a follow-up to the Le Jazz Non compilation of New Zealand music, released on Corpus Hermeticum in 1996.

== Track listing ==
1. Lasse Marhaug : "Light Silence"
2. Supersilent : "C-2.1"
3. Larmoyant : "Push Here For Tiger"
4. DEL : "Sunset Cove"
5. Der Brief : "All Sorts 02"
6. Elektro Nova : "Untitled"
7. Jazzkammer : "President of the Improv Shipping Company"
8. Kjetil Brandsdal : "Komboloi"
9. Arm : "Teddy Transition"
10. Fibo Trespo : "Shit Phifter"
11. Continental Fruit : "Kenosis"
12. Two Shot Sons : "Constant Guitar"
