= Harry Pussy =

American noise rock band

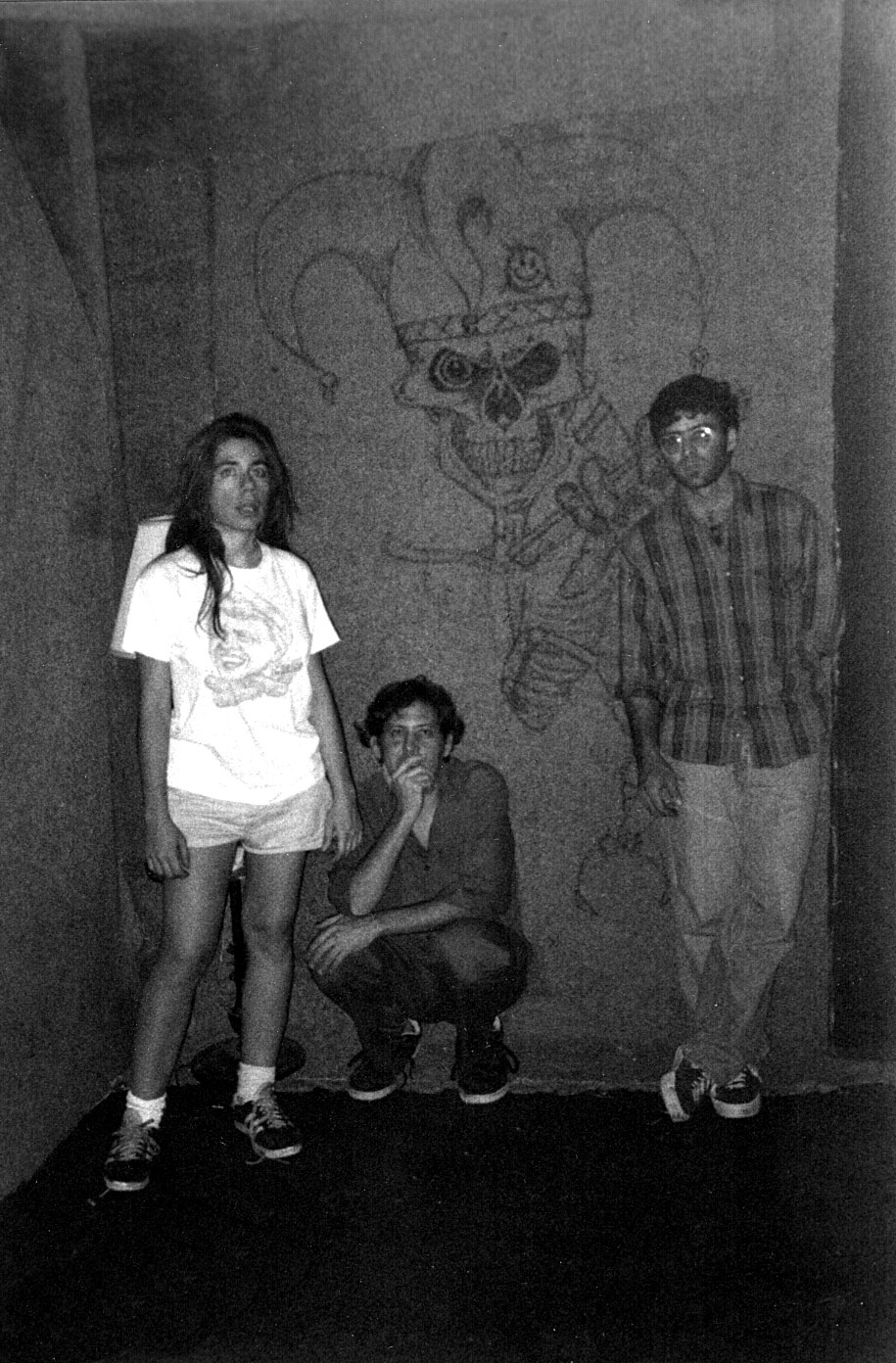
- Harry Pussy, January 1997

Background information
- Origin: Miami, Florida, United States
- Genres: Noise rock, experimental rock, punk rock
- Years active: 1992–1997
- Label: Siltbreeze
- Past members: Bill Orcutt; Adris Hoyos; Mark Feehan; Dan Hosker

Harry Pussy was an American noise rock band from Miami, active from 1992 to 1997. The main members were Bill Orcutt on guitar and vocals and Adris Hoyos on drums and vocals. Other members included Mark Feehan on guitar, later replaced by Dan Hosker. They recorded primarily for the Siltbreeze label.

The often-violent music of Harry Pussy is still well-regarded and highly influential in the noise and noise rock scenes. Bill Orcutt's guitar playing was almost exclusively atonal and performed on a four-string guitar. Adris Hoyos' unrestricted, freeform vocalizations and drumming have been noted as an influence by Chris Corsano and by Heather Leigh.

Following the dissolution of Harry Pussy, Hoyos began playing sporadically in improv groups and Orcutt focused on film-making. Bill Orcutt started playing live and releasing albums again in 2009.

== Discography ==
=== Albums ===
- Harry Pussy (1993, Siltbreeze) LP
- Ride a Dove (1996, Siltbreeze) LP/CD
- Untitled (1997, no label) LP (nicknamed Fuck You and/or Tour)
- Live at Salon Zwerge (1998, Blackbean & Placenta) one sided LP
- Live Fuck Love Songs (1998, Infinite Egg) LP
- Live (1998, Cherry Smash) 10" - Note: final show, Churchill's, Miami 5/5/97
- Let's Build a Pussy (1998, Blackbean & Placenta) 2XLP

=== Singles and EPs ===
- Untitled (1993, Esync) 7"
- Untitled (1993, Esync) 7"
- Please Don't Come Back from the Moon b/w Nazi USA (1994, Blackjack) 7"
- Untitled (a.k.a. Miami Style) (1994, Planet) 7"
- Split w/ Noggin (1994, Chocolate Monk) 7"
- Zero de Conduite (1995, Audible Hiss) 2x7"
- Black Ghost (1996, Siltbreeze) one sided 7"
- Split w/ Bunny Brains (1996, Brutarian) 7" -same material as track one on Bill Orcutt Solo CD
- Split w/ Frosty (1998, Menlo Park) 7"
- Split w/ Pelt (1998, Klang) 7"
- Chuck +1 b/w Mandolin (1998, De Stijl) 7" -credited as Radiation Nation/Toxic Drunks does not say Harry Pussy on record-
- Wreck Small Cocks on Expensive Pussies collaboration w/Cock E.S.P. (1998, Freedom From) Lathe cut 8" edition of 30

=== Cassette tape ===
- Vigilance (1993, Chocolate Monk)

=== Video ===
- Live Fuck Love Songs (1998, Hell's Half Halo) VHS

=== Compilations ===
- Music Generated by Geographical Seclusion and Beer (1993, Esync)
- What was Music? (1996, Siltbreeze) CD compiles first LP early 7" and compilation tracks
- Bulb/Blackjack Split No. 2 7" (1996, Bulb Records/Blackjack Records) Track - "Orphans (live in CA)"
- Bananafish Mag. No. 9 7" - Track "rehearsing the white improviser"
- Cool Beans Mag. No. 6 7" - NOTE-Same material as track 5 on Frog 7"
- Whump Mag. No. 1 2X7 - Track "psychokiller (pt.s 1 & 2)"
- KAOS Theory (1997, Cottlestone Pie)
- KSPC: the Basement Tapes Volume 2 Live Underground - Track "Nazi USA" (1997, KSPC) CD
- Prayer Is the Answer (1998, 777 was 666)
- RRR-500 Lock Grooves (1998, RRRecords) 12"
- Tarot or Aorta: Memories of a PRE Festival (2003, Smack Shire) CD
- You'll Never Play This Town Again (2008, Load) CD compiles Tour LP, Live 10" and various singles.

=== Bootleg ===
- Live on WNUR
- Final Recording Session, Atlanta-3/5/97
- Radiation Nation: Harry Pussy Live in Austin, Texas 1997
