= Shimmy Rivers and and Canal =

- Genres: Garret rusk, post-punk, art rock
- Years active: 2003–2009

Shimmy Rivers and and Canal was a UK beat combo that was formed in Dalston, London in 2003.

In 2005 Resonance FM released a collection of demo recordings. The same year, the band played at Resonance FM's 3rd Anniversary event at the Conway Hall, and in 2006–2007 hosted the station's 'Daddy Said So Land' radio show.

Shimmy Rivers and and Canal disbanded in February 2009, playing a final gig at Barden's Boudoir on February 27. The band agreed to release a 7" record, first on White Heat, then on the Siltbreeze record label, however, both bailed. Their debut album, Forks, recorded and mixed by Capitol K, was left available in 2009.

== Discography ==
Albums

- Forks, 2009

EPs

- The Endless Discourse, 2005, Resonance FM
- Picnic at Angst Rock, White Heat (cancelled), Siltbreeze (cancelled)

Split release

- Dapp In Ze Romb, Split cassette with Blanket, 2006, Undereducated

Compilations

- The Winking Cowboy, The Stolen Recordings Compilation SR-006, 2005
- International Wrong Billy Billy, from Nocturne: Late Nights At The Whitechapel, Manic Squat Records, 2007
- Hadrian's Wall, The Stolen Recordings Compilation SR-008, 2007
- Wird, from Utrophia 03 Compilation, 2006
- Fear of Smell, from the Caff/Flick Compilation, 2006
