= Glass Wars =

Studio album by 1 Mile North
- Released: 2001
- Genre: Electronica, Experimental
- Label: Old Colony Recordings
- Producer: Jon Hills; Mark Bajuk

1 Mile North chronology
Glass Wars (2001)	Minor Shadows (2003)

Professional ratings
Review scores
Source	Rating
AllMusic	4/5 stars

Glass Wars is the debut studio album by experimental electronic group 1 Mile North, originally released in 2001 and re-released in 2003 by Old Colony Recordings.

== Track listing ==
1. "New Clock" - 6:28
2. "Have a Good One What" - 5:45
3. "Parents Arrive" - 6:15
4. "Evil Architecture" - 9:00
5. "Insides" - 5:42
6. "Escorting Deep Waters" - 11:01
7. "Man Rounds Corner" - 3:28
