= The Pin Group =

New Zealand post-punk band

- Origin: Christchurch, New Zealand
- Genres: Post-punk; Dunedin sound; garage rock
- Years active: 1980–1982, 1992
- Labels: Flying Nun, Siltbreeze
- Past members: Roy Montgomery, Peter Stapleton, Desmond Brice, Ross Humphries, Mary Heney, Peter Fryer

The Pin Group were a post-punk band formed in 1980 in Christchurch, New Zealand. They were the first band released on Flying Nun Records, and featured Roy Montgomery, Peter Stapleton, Ross Humphries, Mary Heney, and Peter Fryer.

The group were part of the first post-punk wave to emerge out of New Zealand in the early 1980s, and the influential Dunedin sound associated with Flying Nun. They released two singles and one EP on Flying Nun and played primarily in Christchurch and the South Island before disbanding in 1982. They reformed briefly for one release in 1992, and their discography has been re-issued twice in the years since.

== History ==
=== Formation ===
The Pin Group was formed in November 1980 in Christchurch, New Zealand, originally featuring guitarist and vocalist Roy Montgomery; drummer and lyricist Peter Stapleton, and bassist and poet Desmond Brice. Montgomery and Stapleton had both played in a number of punk bands around Christchurch, some short-lived. Montgomery began hanging out with Brice in late 1980 and started setting his poetry to guitar, which Brice added to with his limited experience on bass. Montgomery recruited Stapleton to join on drums as he had recently finished with the Victor Dimisch Band, and they began shaping songs like "Ambivalence", "Columbia", and "Coat".

The band debuted live at the DB Gladstone Hotel in mid-1981, which was becoming a key venue in the Christchurch alternative scene at the time. Soon after this, Brice's inexperience with the bass led to him being replaced by bassist and vocalist Ross Humphries, but he let the group continue using his lyrics and stayed on for a time to help write. Christchurch artist Ronnie van Hout also became a close collaborator of the band, designing gig posters and all their subsequent record covers. In 1981 van Hout shot a short film of Brice reciting poetry and the band practicing in their Christchurch home.Montgomery, who managed an EMI record store in Christchurch at the time, came into work one day and found someone had spray painted "Roy Division" on the wall outside, a reference to the Pin Group's similarity to Joy Division.

=== Flying Nun releases ===
In early 1981, Montgomery began investigating how to release a single, as the South Island still had no independent rock labels, while the North Island had seen releases from Propeller Records and Ripper Records since late 1979. In March, the band booked a session at Nightshift Studios in Woolston, recording "Ambivalence" & "Columbia". The session was engineered by Nightshift owner Arnie van Bussell, with the studio operating out of his home. The band had no studio experience, so their only strategy was to play as loud as possible. This resulted in "two droney and menacing songs that became murky, echoey and distorted on tape." They didn't have the time or money to improve the result, so instead mixed it to the best of their abilities and looked into getting it pressed. Montgomery knew Roger Shepherd, founder of Flying Nun, who was another local record store manager at the Record Factory and fixture of the local music scene, someone who he'd previously had discussions with about a South Island label. When Montgomery started planning how to get the record out, Shepherd offered to help distribute the record under what would become Flying Nun. Montgomery later recalled:

"At some point over beer or something stronger we started talking… the conversation moved to, 'You know well we’ve got a couple of bands and we could do things here'... Roger [Shepherd] and I knew how the industry worked so it was, 'Oh well we can get things pressed there are factories here and plants and [we] can get artwork done, it can’t be that hard.'"

While Shepherd helped, Montgomery was primarily responsible for getting "Ambivalence" released. A friend at a local print shop assisted with sourcing the record sleeves, and through contacts at the EMI head office he had through his job, Montgomery was able to get a run of 300 7" records pressed at the EMI plant in Lower Hutt. In winter 1981, the band received the records from EMI, and were dismayed when the final result was much more rough and muddy than they had mixed at Nightshift. They looked into returning and re-pressing the records, with Humphries at the time telling the Christchurch Star "there have been some major changes from what we recorded", but it turned out to be prohibitively expensive. Instead, the decision was made to sell 200 of the 300 records to break even on the production. Soon after they received the pressings of "Ambivalence", the band went to Nightshift for another session in July, recording "Coat" and "Jim". To avoid the issues of the first pressing which they believed were caused by volume, the band recorded the tracks quieter during this session, to limited effect.

==== "Ambivalence" and "Coat" ====
The "Ambivalence" 7" was released in September as the first single on newly formed Flying Nun Records (FN001), a week before The Clean's "Tally Ho!". The packaging, marketing, and information was intentionally minimal, with Flying Nun only naming the group and song titles in the initial announcement. The cover, designed by Ronnie van Hout, was a black-on-black silkscreen print of soldiers walking in front of helicopters, with no text anywhere except for a "FN001" mark on the record's label. Reviews of the record were not positive, with the band even allegedly going so far as to stop copies from reaching the local papers' reviewers. Despite this and little radio play, the single charted for a week in October, reaching #36, and the 200 released sold quickly.

"Coat" was released soon after in November, also pressed at EMI. The decision to record quieter had not helped improve the final result, and the result was similarly muddy but with less energy than the first single. Ronnie van Hout's cover for the single was an Andy Warhol-inspired screen print of four sliced kiwifruit, each one handmade with three separate passes of printing and at least eight colour variants across the 300 produced. The band's name and the single's titles were stamped on the back, alongside a teaser for the next single "Power". Included with some copies was an insert soliciting orders for the unsold copies of "Ambivalence", and that the next single would be a "genuine studio affair". "Coat" was similarly critiqued in the press, with Star reviewer Rob White writing "here we have an obviously good song ("Coat") ruined by a lack of hard cash." Despite this, the single still managed to chart, debuting at #38 and re-entering the chart before Christmas at #39.

==== The Pin Group Go to Town EP ====
After the release of the two singles, the group discussed widening their sound and recording a proper studio release. They recruited Mary Heney from fellow Christchurch band 25 Cents on guitar and backup vocals, and Peter Fryer on viola, expanding into a five-piece. Montgomery contacted the EMI New Zealand head office through his record store job and requested to book recording time at the EMI Studios outside of Wellington. They said yes, and in February 1982 the group travelled to EMI Studios to record five songs. The session was engineered by Frank Douglas, an in-house engineer at EMI who had been working at the studio since the 1950s, and helped the group navigate the issues they'd previously had in the studio. The group recorded four new songs and re-recorded "Ambivalence", with all five songs being tracked and mixed within one working day. The band played their last show in March 1982 at the Christchurch Arts Centre’s Jazz Cellar, as Montgomery departed for England soon after. The Pin Group Go to Town EP was released in May 1982 on Flying Nun, with the 500 copies selling relatively well while reviews were mixed to positive.

=== Hiatus ===
Following the disbandment of the Pin Group, Humphries joined Clean offshoot group The Great Unwashed in 1982 before the group disbanded in 1984. Montgomery returned to Christchurch in 1984, soon starting The Shallows with Mary Heney and Scorched Earth Policy member Mick Elborado, which released one 7" in May 1985 before going defunct. Stapleton and Humphries would later start The Terminals in 1986, featuring Heney's sister Susan on bass. Montgomery and Stapleton would also play in Dadamah together in the early 1990s, an experimental rock group that released one album. After leaving Dadamah in 1993, Montgomery released his debut album Scenes From The South Island in 1995, marking the start of his solo career.

=== Reunion and re-issues ===
In 1992, the band re-united to record a 7" single on Siltbreeze named 11 Years After, featuring a new version of "Coat" and their often-performed cover of "Hurricane Fighter Plane" by Red Krayola. In 1997, Siltbreeze also issued a compilation album titled The Pin Group, featuring the band's three singles, the Go To Town EP, and a live cover of "Low Rider" by War.

In 2011, Flying Nun re-issued the band's discography in a remastered album titled Ambivalence, including a full live performance at the Gladstone Hotel from July 1981.

Peter Stapleton died in March 2020, and Mary Heney died in December 2020.

== Discography ==
=== Compilation albums ===
Compilation albums, with label and release date
Title	Details
Retrospective	Released: 10 June 1997; Label: Siltbreeze; Format: CD
Ambivalence	Released: 2011; Label: Flying Nun; Cat #: FN520/FN 520 A; Format: 1x12" LP, 1xCD

=== Extended plays ===
Extended plays, with label and release date
Title	Details
The Pin Group Goes to Town	Released: May 1982; Label: Flying Nun; Cat #: FN1967; Format: 12"

=== Singles ===
Singles, with label, release date and chart position
Title	Details	Peak chart position (NZ)
"Ambivalence" / "Columbia"	Released: September 1981; Label: Flying Nun; Cat #: FN001; Format: 7"	36
"Coat" / "Jim"	Released: November 1981; Label: Flying Nun; Cat #: FN003; Format: 7"	38
11 Years After	Released: 1992; Label: Siltbreeze; Cat #: SB23; Format: 12"	—
