= Above Ground =

New Zealand rock band

- Above Ground rehearsal, 566a Colombo St, Christchurch, 1983

Background information
- Origin: New Zealand
- Genres: Freeflow psychedelic Christchurch garage
- Years active: 1983
- Labels: Siltbreeze
- Members: Bill Direen; Maryrose Crook; Stuart Page; Carol Woodward

Above Ground was a band from Christchurch, New Zealand formed in 1983.

== History ==
Above Ground developed out of the friendship of the four members: Bill Direen (Guitar/Vocals), Carol Woodward (Keyboards), Maryrose Wilkinson (Bass/Vocals) and Stuart Page (Drums). The group played locally and at the Punakaiki Music Festival (West Coast, New Zealand); and would have been forgotten like a lot of bands had Page not recorded nearly every practice and concert and organised the "Gone AIWA" cassette (1983), re-released in 2011 on vinyl by Siltbreeze.

Historian of NZ music John Dix mentions the group in his encyclopaedia of NZ rock and roll Stranded in Paradise: New Zealand Rock'n'Roll, 1955-1988.

== Cassette ==
Gone AIWA (1983)

== Album ==
Black vinyl 12" 33 1/3 album was released by Siltbreeze Records, Philadelphia, USA, (from cassette of 1983). 2011.
