= 1 Mile North =

US musical group

- Origin: New York
- Genres: Post-rock; Ambient; Electronic; Experimental
- Instruments: Synthesizer; Piano; Guitar; Bass
- Labels: Old Colony Recording; Ba Da Bing! Records; Music Fellowship
- Members: Jon Hills; Mark Bajuk
- Website: Official Facebook

1 Mile North is an ambient / post-rock duo, consisting of guitarist Jon Hills and keyboardist Mark Bajuk.

== Albums ==
The band has released four full-length albums, a split LP with Colophon and The Wind-Up Bird, and a collection of home and live recordings.

Their fourth album "Tombs and Cocoons" was released on February 20, 2020.

== Use of music ==
The band's music has been featured in Steven Okazaki's Oscar-nominated documentary The Conscience of Nhem En, as well as Okazaki's White Light/Black Rain: The Destruction of Hiroshima and Nagasaki.

Music was also featured within the score of 2013's Facing Fear, a documentary from Jason Cohen nominated for an Oscar in 2014.

== Discography ==
Studio albums

- Glass Wars (Old Colony, 2001)
- Minor Shadows (Ba Da Bing!, 2003)
- Awakened by Decay (Wortcunner, 2016)
- Tombs & Cocoons (Wortcunner, 2020)
- The Sunken Nest (Mutual Skies, 2022)

Other releases

- Convection. Conduction. Radiation. (Music Fellowship, 2004) (split EP with Colophon & The Wind-Up Bird)
- Altare Della Patria: Home and Concert Recordings 2000-2003 (Old Colony, 2004)
- Sketches from Back Then (Wortcunner, 2016)
