= Bright (American band) =

American band

- Origin: Boston, Massachusetts
- Genres: Post-rock
- Instruments: Vocals, accordion, clarinet, electric guitar, Fender Rhodes, mandolin musical keyboard, steel-string acoustic guitar
- Years active: 1993–present
- Labels: Ba Da Bing! Strange Attractors Audio House; Darla Records

Bright is a post-rock and ambient music group based in Brooklyn, New York.

== History ==
Bright self-released a cassette before signing deals with two independent labels, Ba Da Bing! Records and Darla Records, and releasing records alternately on both labels. Darla released their 1997 full-length An Albatross Guest House and Bright's 1998 contribution to the Bliss Out series, Blue Christian, while Ba Da Bing! released a self-titled 1996 album, Full Negative or Breaks in 2000, and The Miller Fantasies in 2002, as well as a 2003 compilation called A Music Sampler. Switching to the Strange Attractors label, they released the album Bells Break their Towers in 2005, their latest album to date.

== Discography ==
=== LP recordings ===
- Bright (1995 cassette-only release on Eek, limited to 100 copies)
- Bright (1996 release on Ba Da Bing!)
- The Albatross Guest House (1997 release on Darla)
- Blue Christian (1998 release that also served as Bright's contribution to the Bliss Out series on Darla)
- Full Negative (or) Breaks (2000 release on Ba Da Bing!)
- The Miller Fantasies (2002 release on Ba Da Bing!)
- Bells Break Their Towers (2005 release on Strange Attractors)

=== Singles, EPs and compilations ===
- V/A Dreamboat "Cecilia" (1997 release on Cassiel Records)
- Fuxa / Bright "City and Metro" and "How I Reached Home" (1997 split 7-inch on Darla Records)
- "Plymouth Rock" b/w "Superstrings," "Nova" (1998 7-inch on Ba Da Bing!)
- V/A Badaboom Gramophone, Vol. 2 (1998 release on Ba Da Bing!)
- V/A Darla 100 (2000 release on Darla)
- V/A Neon Meate Dream of a Octafish: A Tribute to Captain Beefheart & His Magic Band (2003 release on Animal World)
- V/A Yeti No. 4 (2006 Yeti Magazine CD compilation)
