= Wreck Small Speakers on Expensive Stereos =

New Zealand band

- Origin: New Zealand
- Genres: Noise rock, synthpop
- Years active: 1980–1986
- Labels: Wrecked Music; Every Secret Thing; Xpressway; Flying Nun Records
- Past members: Michael Morley; Richard Ram; Denise Roughan

Wreck Small Speakers on Expensive Stereos was a band from Dunedin, New Zealand consisting of vocalists and guitarists Michael Morley, who also played the keyboard and Richard Ram, who also played bass. During the early 1980s they released numerous cassettes through the Wrecked Music and Every Secret Thing labels. In 1986 the Flying Nun label released their River Falling Love EP, which was reissued in 1993 by the Ajax Records label. The reissue featured bonus tracks culled from their earlier cassettes, some featuring vocals by Denise Roughan of Look Blue Go Purple. Roughan later went on to form the 3Ds in the late eighties, while Morley went on to perform with The Dead C.

== Discography ==
Date of Release	Title	Label	Charted	Certification	Catalog Number
Albums
1983	My Blue Fairy Godmother	Wrecked Music	-	-	WRECK14
1983	3.V.M.	Wrecked Music	-	-	WRECK20
EPs
1986	River Falling Love	Flying Nun Records	-	-	FN068
1993	River Falling Love (reissue)	Ajax Records	-	-	AJAX 029
Cassettes
1984	Over My Skull	Every Secret Thing	-	-	EST 06
1984	Cave	Every Secret Thing	-	-	EST 21
1984	Worlds Fall Apart	Every Secret Thing	-	-	EST 24
1985	A Summer in Taradale	-	-	-	
1988	A Child's Guide To...	Xpressway	-	-	XWAY03
