= Bunny Brains =

US musical group

Bunny Brains or Bunnybrains is an American punk/noise/psych ensemble, fronted by Daniel Seward. Originating from Danbury, Connecticut, United States, in the late 1980s, Bunny Brains has recorded 14 albums, with a variety of members. Bunny Brains's output constitutes a wide array of live recordings, self-released records as well as some on more established labels such as 1995's LP put out by Matador Records. Bunny Brains has a largely undocumented role in contemporary rock; they have toured with such acts as Sebadoh, Devendra Banhart, Jackie O' Motherfucker, and Japanther.

Bunny Brains performed at The Kitchen as part of performance in collaboration with the artist Aïda Ruilova.
