= Dadamah =

New Zealand experimental rock band

- Origin: Christchurch, Canterbury, New Zealand
- Genres: Experimental rock, space rock, neo-psychedelia, psychedelic rock, grunge, indie rock, post-rock, garage rock
- Years active: 1990–1993
- Labels: Kranky, Majora
- Past members: Roy Montgomery; Kim Pieters; Janine Stagg; Peter Stapleton

Dadamah were a band from New Zealand, active during the early 1990s. The band consisted of Kim Pieters, Peter Stapleton, Roy Montgomery, and Janine Stagg. They released their sole album This Is Not a Dream in 1992. After the band broke up, the members went on to numerous other music projects, including Flies Inside The Sun, Doramaar, Dissolve, and Rain.

== Discography ==
Studio albums

- This Is Not a Dream (1992)

Singles

- Nicotine/High Time (1991)
- Scratch Sun/Radio Brain (1991)
