= We (band) =

Norwegian rock band

WE
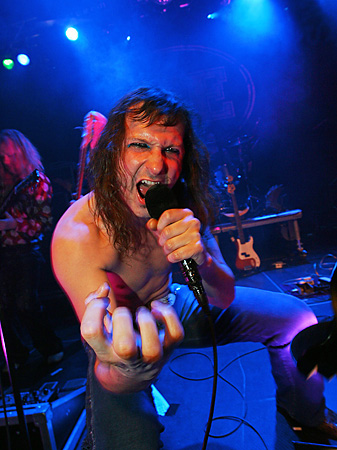
- Thomas Felberg live with WE during by:Larm 2006.

Background information
- Origin: Oslo, Norway
- Genres: Range includes: Rock; Electro; Experimental
- Years active: 1992 – present
- Labels: Vice Recordings; Smalltown Supersound
- Members: Thomas Felberg; Andreas Dons Kirkvaag; Kristian Dons Kirkvaag; Geir Anders Jensen; Jan Tariq Rui Rahman
- Past members: Paal V. Bakke
- Website: www.werock.org

We (stylized as WE) is a Norwegian rock band from Oslo founded in 1992.

== Biography ==
We debuted as house band for the NRK comic series "The Show" (with Otto Jespersen, Charlo Halvorsen and Stig Holmer) in autumn 1992. After a few gigs in the Oslo region, including bands like Turboneger, the band's original bassist Paal V. Bakke was replaced by Geir Anders "Goshi" Jensen in 1993. Other band members are Thomas Felberg on vocals, Andreas "Don" Dons Kirkvaag on guitar and Kristian "Krisvaag" Dons Kirkvaag on drums, both sons of comedian Trond Kirkvaag (1946-2007).

In 1994 the debut album In a Field of Moose was released on their own label Nun Music. Two years later We signed a record deal with the Metal Company Voices of Wonder and released the album Violently Coloured Sneakers (1996). Their third album, Wooferwheels, was recorded during the summer of 1997 in Oslo. The We sound was even more recognizable on this self-produced release. Livin' the Lore was recorded in late 1998 and released in early 1999. The acquaintance with the father of modern stoner rock, Chris Goss, was rewarded with a new and much larger European tour in summer 1999 as support for the band Masters of Reality. The recording of their fifth album, Dinosauric Futurobic, took a year, and was released on the label Black Balloon in March 2002.

The breakthrough in Norway started with good reviews for the album Livin' the Lore, and escalated with the new release. The bandet played at many festivals, like the Quart Festival and the Øya Festival among others. Later that year they was support for the band Queens of The Stone Age. In 2003 the keyboardist Jan Tariq Rui Rahman joined the band, and their 2004 album Smugglers reached No. 1 on the Norwegian charts. and also was recipient of the Spellemannprisen award. They are known as an energetic live band fronted by vocalist Thomas Felberg who poses in colorful attire and Indian-inspired headwear.

== Band members ==
Current members

- Thomas Felberg - vocals
- Andreas Dons Kirkvaag - guitar
- Kristian Dons Kirkvaag - drums
- Geir Anders Jensen - bass (1993)
- Jan Tariq Rui Rahman - keyboards (2003)

== Past members ==
- Paal V. Bakke - bass

== Honors ==
- 2004: Spellemannprisen in the category best Rock band, for the album Smugglers

== Discography ==
Albums

- 1994: In a Field of Moose (Nun Music)
- 1996: Violently Coloured Sneakers (Voices of Wonder)
- 1997: Wooferwheels (Voices of Wonder)
- 1999: Livin' the Lore (Voices of Wonder)
- 2002: Dinosauric Futurobic (Black Balloon)
- 2003: Lightyears Ahead (Black Balloon)
- 2004: Smugglers (Nun Music)
- 2008: Tension & Release (Nun Music)

== We have been support acts for ==
- 1999: Masters of Reality
- 2002: Queens of the Stone Age
- 2006: Motörhead

Awards
Preceded by Turboneger	Recipient of the Rock Spellemannprisen; 2004	Succeeded by Madrugada
