= The Strapping Fieldhands =

Strapping Fieldhands
- Origin: Philadelphia
- Genres: Indie rock, lo-fi rock
- Years active: 1991–1997; 1999–2014
- Labels: Siltbreeze Records; Omphalos Records; The Now Sound; Shangri-La Records
- Members: Bob Dickie; Bob Malloy; Jacy Webster; Jeff Werner; Tony Collins
- Past members: Sky Kishlo; John Ferenzik; Robert Bell

The Strapping Fieldhands are an American indie rock band based in Philadelphia, and are associated with the Siltbreeze label and American lo-fi psych scene. The band's first live incarnation was a three-piece opening for The Frogs. During the 1990s, the Fieldhands toured extensively with The Grifters, Guided by Voices, Pavement, V-3 and Thinking Fellers Union Local 282, playing shows with The Fall, Jon Spencer Blues Explosion, Royal Trux and others.

== Discography ==
=== Albums ===
- Discus (Omphalos Records, 1994)
- The Caul (The Now Sound, 1995)
- Wattle & Daub (Shangri-La Records, 1996)
- Third Kingdom (Omphalos Records, 2002)
- Alluvium Trinkets (Omphalos Records, 2018)

=== EPs ===
- The Demiurge E.P. (Siltbreeze Records, 1991)
- Future Pastoral E.P. (Siltbreeze Records, 1993)
- In The Pineys E.P. (Siltbreeze Records, 1994)

=== Compilations ===
- Gobs on the Midway - Singles 1991-95 CD (Siltbreeze Records, 1996)

=== Singles ===
- Stacey Donelly 7-inch (Siltbreeze Records, 1992)
- Neptune's World 7-inch (Siltbreeze Records, 1995)
- Sun 7-inch (Compulsiv Records, 1995)
- Goat Cheese/Porn Weasel split 7-inch with Mudhoney, (Amphetamine Reptile Records, 1995)
- Ben Franklin Airbath/Forget You split 7-inch with The Simple Ones (Shangri-La Records, 1996

=== Appearances ===
- "Just Too Much" on Pimp's Toe Accelerator E.P., (Ptolemaic Terrascope, 1994)
- "Tale from Telegewae" on Succour: The Terrascope Benefit Album, (Ptolemaic Terrascope/Flydaddy Records, 1996)
- "Ollie's Interfader" on Carry On Ooij - A Brinkman Waaghals Compilation, (Brinkman Records, 1996)
- "Porn Weasel" on Screwed Motion Picture Soundtrack, (Amphetamine Reptile Records, 1996)
- "Stacey Donnelly" on CMJ New Music March - Volume 43, (College Music Journal, 1997)
- "Boo Hoo Hoo" on Tiny Idols, (Snowglobe Records, 2005)
