= The Terminals =

New Zealand alternative rock band

- Origin: New Zealand
- Genres: Rock
- Labels: Xpressway, Flying Nun Records
- Members: Stephen Cogle; Mick Elborado; Peter Stapleton; Brian Crook; John Chrisstoffels
- Past members: Ross Humphries; Susan Heney; Maryrose Crook

The Terminals were a New Zealand alternative rock band. They released material on the Xpressway and Flying Nun labels.

== History ==
The band was formed in 1988, with several members being veterans of other bands. Vocalist Stephen Cogle and drummer Peter Stapleton had both been members of The Victor Dimisich Band in the early 1980s, Stapleton also playing with The Pin Group and Scorched Earth Policy. Guitarist Ross Humphries was an ex-member of The Pin Group, and Mick Elborado played bass and keyboards with Scorched Earth Policy. Signing to Flying Nun, the band's debut release was the Disconnect EP in 1988, followed by two albums for the label. Humphries was replaced by former Scorched Earth Policy guitarist Brian Crook. The band moved to the Xpressway label for their third album, Touch. Little Things followed in 1995.

Drummer and lyricist Peter Stapleton died in 2020.

== Band members ==
=== Original line-up ===
- Stephen Cogle (guitar/vocals)
- Ross Humphries (guitar/vocals)
- Susan Heney (bass)
- Mick Elborado (organ)
- Peter Stapleton (drums)

=== Middle line-up ===
- Stephen Cogle (guitar/vocals)
- Brian Crook (guitar/vocals)
- John Chrisstoffels (bass)
- Mick Elborado (organ)
- Peter Stapleton (drums)

=== Last line-up ===
- Stephen Cogle (guitar/vocals)
- Nicole Moffat (violin/vocals)
- John Chrisstoffels (bass)
- Mick Elborado (organ)
- Peter Stapleton (drums)

== Discography ==
Date of Release	Title	Label	Charted	Certification	Catalog Number
Albums
1990	Uncoffined	Flying Nun Records Festival Records	-	-	FN116 L30424
1991	Disease	Xpressway	-	-	
1992	Touch	Raffmond Records	-	-	
1995	Little Things	Raffmond Records	-	-	
2007	Last Days Of The Sun	Last Visible Dog	-	-	LVD 116
2017	Antiseptic	Ba Da Bing Records	-	-	BING129
EPs
1988	Disconnect	Flying Nun Records	-	-	FN091
Compilations
1992	Cul-de-sac	Flying Nun Records	-	-	FN231
2014	Singles & Sundries	Ba Da Bing Records	-	-	BING 104
Live album
1997	Live	Medication Records	-	-	

=== Featured appearances ===
The group have appeared on a few compilations since their inception in New Zealand and Australia. The following is a list of these albums that have featured tracks by The Terminals.

- (1992) – What's That Noise (xpressway)

=== Singles ===
Year	Single	Album	NZ Singles Chart	Certification
1990	"Do The Void"		-	-
1993	"Black Creek"		-	-
1992	"Witchdoctors"		-	-
1996	"Medusa"		-	-
