= Peter Stapleton =

New Zealand musician (1954–2020)

- Born: 25 April 1954; New Zealand
- Died: 22 March 2020 (aged 65)
- Instrument: Drums
- Formerly of: The Terminals; Vacuum; The Pin Group; Dadamah; Flies Inside the Sun; Scorched Earth Policy; Eye

Peter James Stapleton (25 April 1954 – 22 March 2020) was a musician from New Zealand, best known as the drummer and co-founder of the alternative rock band The Terminals. Stapleton was also a member of the groups Vacuum, The Pin Group, Dadamah, Flies Inside the Sun, Eye, and Scorched Earth Policy.

== Career ==
Stapleton was principally a drummer, although he also contributed shortwave radio and sample manipulations to various recordings.

In 1976 Stapleton joined Vacuum, who went largely unrecorded. The band consisted of Stapleton, Bill Direen, Steve Cogle, Peter Fryer and, later replacing Fryer, Alan Meek. When Vacuum split, Bill Direen went on to form The Bilders, while Stapleton, Cogle, Tony O'Grady and Meek, along with singer/songwriter Mary Heney transformed into The Victor Dimisich Band, which released its first self-titled EP on Flying Nun Records in 1982. The Victor Dimisich Band disbanded, and posthumously released a cassette, Mekong Delta Blues, on the Xpressway label in 1988. Stapleton and Cogle went on to form The Terminals in 1986.

Stapleton also formed The Pin Group with Roy Montgomery and Ross Humphries in 1981. Their 1981 "Ambivalence" 7-inch was the first release on the Flying Nun label. Another 7-inch, "Coat" was issued later that year, followed by The Pin Group Go To Town EP in 1982. The Pin Group disbanded soon after, later reuniting in 1992 for the "Eleven Years After" 7-inch. A compilation of these recordings was released in 1997 on the Siltbreeze label, and later in expanded form on Flying Nun.

Stapleton formed the garage rock band Scorched Earth Policy, who released two EPs; "Dust to Dust" (1984) and "Going Through a Hole in the Back of Your Head" (1985). These recordings were later compiled and reissued on the Medication label as Keep Away From The Wires, and on the Siltbreeze label as Going Thru' A Hole in the Back of Your Head.

During the 1990s, Stapleton moved into more experimental and noise music, forming numerous groups such as Dadamah with Roy Montgomery from The Pin Group, Flies Inside the Sun, and Sleep. In 1996 he founded the Metonymic and Medication record labels. From 2003 until his death, he played in Dunedin improvised psychedelic noise rock trio Eye.

In 2011, Stapleton completed a Master of Arts degree at the University of Otago, with a thesis titled The Rockumentaries, Direct Cinema, and the Politics of the 1960s.

Stapleton died in Dunedin on 22 March 2020.
