= Xpressway =

Record label

Xpressway was a record label founded by New Zealand musician Bruce Russell in Dunedin in 1988. Until it ceased in 1993, Xpressway released a variety of New Zealand musicians, primarily on cassette, but its catalogue included several 7-inch singles and one 12-inch EP.

Russell began releasing and distributing cassettes via mail order, to offer a 'lifeboat' for those artists who had been dropped by Flying Nun Records, as Flying Nun moved away from its low-fi roots to focus on artists with more 'commercial potential'.

Artists whose material was released by Xpressway include The Dead C, This Kind of Punishment, Wreck Small Speakers on Expensive Stereos, Alastair Galbraith, Graeme Jefferies, The Terminals, and Sandra Bell.

== Discography ==
- X/Way 01 Dead C Live Dead See cassette
- X/Way 02 This Kind of Punishment TKP Live 1985 cassette
- X/Way 03 Wreck Small Speakers on Expensive Stereos A Childs Guide To Wreck Small Speakers On Expensive Stereos cassette
- X/Way 04 Alastair Galbraith Hurry on Down cassette
- X/Way 05 Various Xpressway Pile Up cassette
- X/Way 06 Various I Hate Pavel Tishy's Guts cassette
- X/Way 07 Dead C The Sunstabbed 7-inch EP
- X/Way 08 Victor Dimisich Band The Mekong Delta Blues cassette
- X/Way 09 Peter Gutteridge Pure cassette
- X/Way 10 Alastair Galbraith and Graeme Jefferies "Timebomb" / "Bravely, Bravely" 7-inch
- X/Way 11 Peter Jefferies and Robbie Muir "Catapult" / "The Fate Of The Human Carbine" 7-inch
- X/Way 12 Dead C Play DR 503b cassette
- X/Way 13 Plagal Grind Plagal Grind 12-inch EP
- X/Way 14 Sferic Experiment Bunny Liver cassette
- X/Way 15 This Kind of Punishment Beard Of Bees cassette
- X/Way 16 Peter Jefferies The Last Great Challenge in a Dull World cassette
- X/Way 17 The Terminals "Do The Void" / "Deadly Tango" 7-inch
- X/Way 18 Angelhead Eat cassette
- X/Way 19 The Terminals Disease cassette
- X/Way 20 Scorched Earth Policy Foaming Out cassette
- X/Way 21 David Mitchell with Denise Roughan "Dead Dog In Port Chalmers" / "Dogs" / "Grey Funnel Line" 7-inch
- X/Way 22 Sandra Bell Dreams Of Falling cassette
- X/Way 23 Heazelwood Hellmouth 66 cassette

== See also ==
- List of record labels
- Bruce Russell
