= A Handful of Dust =

1934 novel by Evelyn Waugh

- Cover of first UK edition (1934)
- Author: Evelyn Waugh
- Language: English
- Genre: Fiction
- Publisher: Chapman & Hall (hardcover); Penguin Books (paperback)
- Publication date: 1934 (Hardback); 1951 (Paperback)
- Publication place: United Kingdom

A Handful of Dust is a novel by the British writer Evelyn Waugh. First published in 1934, it is often grouped with the author's early, satirical comic novels for which he became famous in the pre–Second World War years. Some commentators regard it as a transitional work due to its serious undertones, pointing towards Waugh's Catholic postwar fiction.

The story concerns the misfortunes of Tony Last, a contented but shallow English country squire who, having been betrayed by his wife and seen his illusions shattered one by one, seeks solace by joining an expedition to the Brazilian jungle, only to find himself trapped in a remote outpost as the prisoner and plaything of an insane settler. Waugh incorporated several autobiographical elements into the story, notably his own recent desertion by his young wife. In 1933–34 he had undertaken a journey into the South American interior, and a number of incidents and personalities from the voyage are incorporated into the novel. Tony's singular fate in the jungle was first used by Waugh as the subject of an independent short story, published in 1933 under the title "The Man Who Liked Dickens".

The book's initial critical reception was modest, but it was popular with the public and has never been out of print. In the years since publication the book's reputation has grown; it is generally considered one of Waugh's best works, and has more than once figured on unofficial lists of the 20th century's best novels.

Waugh had converted to Roman Catholicism in 1930, after which his satirical, secular writings drew hostility from some Catholic quarters. He did not introduce overt religious themes into A Handful of Dust, but later explained that he intended the book to demonstrate the futility of humanist, as distinct from religious, especially Catholic, values. The book has been dramatised for radio, stage and screen.

== Plot ==
Tony Last is a country gentleman living with his wife, Brenda, and their eight-year-old son, John Andrew, at Hetton Abbey, Tony's ancestral home. Hetton house is a Victorian neo-Gothic pastiche described as architecturally devoid of interest, by a local guide book, and ugly, by Brenda, yet Hetton Abbey is Tony's pride and joy. Content with country life, Tony is unaware of Brenda's boredom and dissatisfaction and of John Andrew's waywardness. In the event, Brenda meets John Beaver, and, despite acknowledging that he is a dull and insignificant man, she begins a sexual affair with him. She then starts spending her weeks in London, and persuades Tony to finance a small flat, which she rents from Mrs. Beaver, John's mother, who is a canny businesswoman. Although the affair between Brenda and John is known to their social circle in London, Tony remains oblivious; attempts by Brenda and her friends to set him up with a mistress are absurdly unsuccessful.

Brenda is in London when their son is killed in a riding accident. On being told that "John is dead", Brenda at first thinks that it is Beaver who has died; on learning that the dead John is her son John Andrew, Brenda betrays her true feelings by uttering an involuntary "Thank God!" After the funeral, she tells Tony she wants a divorce so she can marry Beaver. Tony is shattered, but agrees to protect Brenda's social reputation by allowing her to divorce him, and to provide her with £500 a year. After spending an awkward weekend in Brighton with Milly — a woman hired to contrive divorce evidence — Tony learns from Brenda's brother that, encouraged by Beaver, Brenda is now demanding £2,000 a year: a sum that would require Tony to sell Hetton. Tony's illusions are shattered. Luckily, because Milly brought her child with her to Brighton Tony is able to establish he did not commit adultery. He withdraws from the divorce negotiations, and announces that he intends to travel for six months. On his return, he says, Brenda may have her divorce, but without any financial settlement.

With no prospect of Tony's money, Beaver loses interest in Brenda. Meanwhile, Tony has met the explorer Dr Messinger, and joins him on an expedition in search of a supposed lost city in the Amazon rainforest. On the outward journey, Tony has a shipboard romance with Thérèse de Vitré, a young girl whose Roman Catholicism causes her to shun him when he admits he is married. In Brazil, Messinger proves an incompetent organiser; he cannot control the native guides, who abandon him and Tony in the depths of the jungle. They attempt to trek out, but Tony becomes too ill to walk. Messinger leaves in their only canoe to find help, but is swept over a waterfall and killed.

In delirium, Tony wanders until he is rescued by Mr. Todd, a British Guianan, who rules a small, extended family in a clearing in the jungle, where Todd nurses Tony back to health. Although illiterate, Todd owns copies of the complete works of Charles Dickens and asks Tony to read to him. When Tony's health recovers and he asks to be helped on his way, Todd repeatedly demurs. Tony continues with the readings, but the atmosphere becomes menacing, as Tony understands that he is being held against his will. When a search party of Europeans approaches the jungle settlement, Todd sedates Tony, keeps him hidden, and gives the search party Tony's wristwatch because "they wanted something to take back to England, where a reward is being offered for news of [Tony]". When Tony awakens he learns that his hopes of rescue are gone, and that he is condemned to indefinitely read Dickens to his captor in the Amazonian jungle. Back in England, Tony's social circle accept his death. Tony's cousins inherit Hetton Abbey and erect a memorial to Tony; Brenda marries a friend of Tony's.

== Background ==
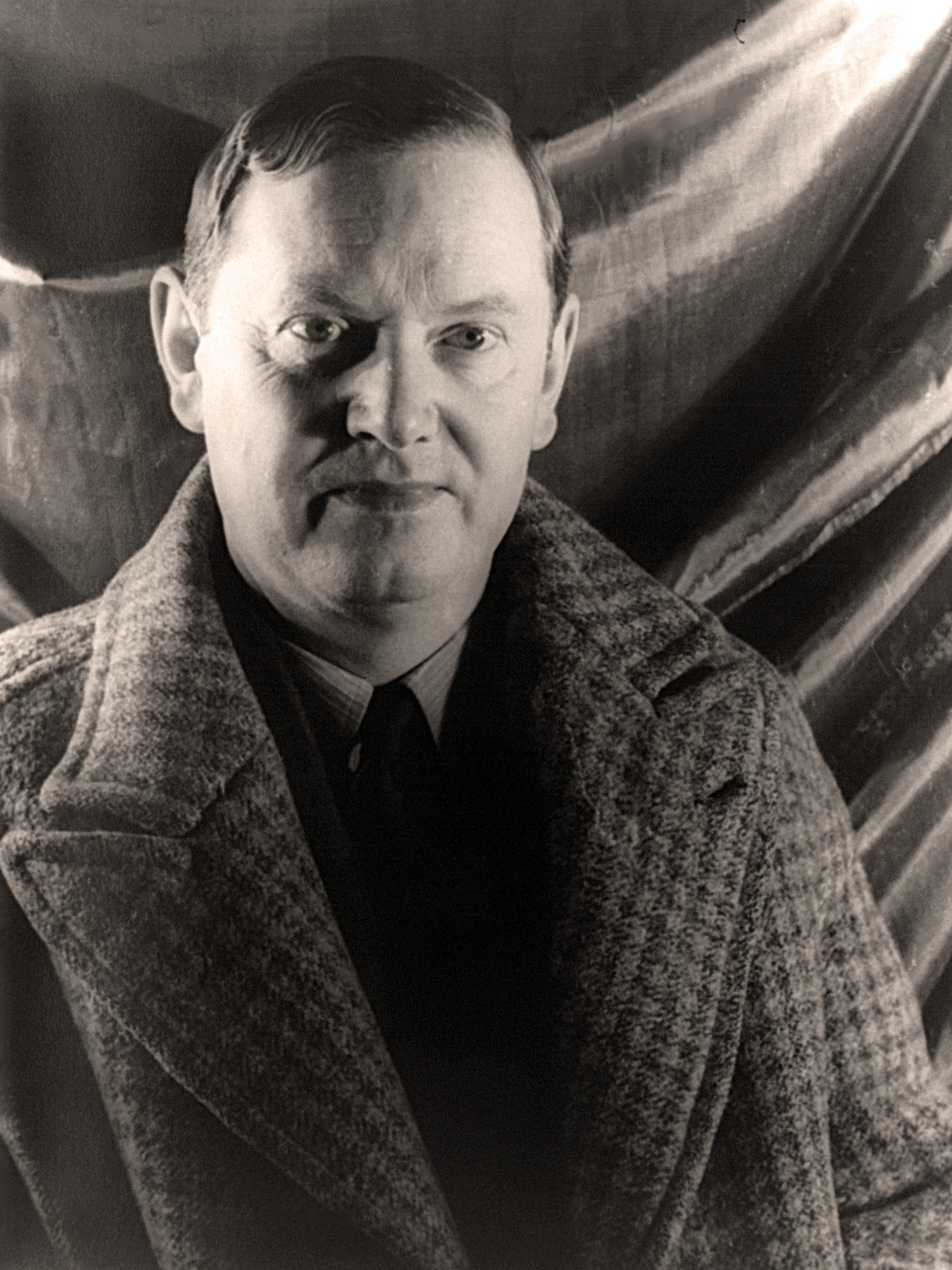
Evelyn Waugh (photographed by Carl Van Vechten, December 1940)

Evelyn Waugh, born in 1903, was the younger son of Arthur Waugh, a writer and literary figure who was the managing director of the London publishing firm of Chapman & Hall. After attending Lancing College and Hertford College, Oxford, Waugh taught for three years in a series of private preparatory schools before beginning his career as a writer. His first commercially printed work was a short story, "The Balance", which Chapman and Hall included in a 1926 anthology. He worked briefly as a Daily Express reporter, and wrote a short biography of the pre-Raphaelite painter Dante Gabriel Rossetti before achieving success in 1928 with the publication of his comic novel Decline and Fall. By the end of 1932 Waugh had written two further novels, Vile Bodies and Black Mischief, and two travel books. His professional successes coincided with private upheavals; in June 1928 he married Evelyn Gardner, but just over a year later the marriage ended when she declared her love for the couple's mutual friend John Heygate. Reconciliation proved impossible, and Waugh commenced divorce proceedings in September 1929. At the same time, Waugh was undergoing instruction which led to his reception, in September 1930, into the Roman Catholic Church.

Waugh's adherence to Catholic teaching on divorce caused him frustration while awaiting the possible annulment of his marriage. He had fallen in love with Teresa Jungman, a lively socialite whose Catholicism precluded any intimacy in their relationship since in the eyes of the Church Waugh remained married. Waugh's conversion did not greatly affect the acerbic and sharply satirical tone of his fiction—his principal characters were frequently amoral and their activities sometimes shocking. Waugh claimed "the right to write of man's depravity in such a fashion as to make it unattractive". When Black Mischief was published in 1932, the editor of the Catholic journal The Tablet, Ernest Oldmeadow, launched a violent attack on the book and its author, stating that the novel was "a disgrace to anybody professing the Catholic name". Waugh, wrote Oldmeadow, "was intent on elaborating a work outrageous not only to Catholic but to ordinary standards of modesty". Waugh made no public rebuttal of these charges; an open letter to the Cardinal Archbishop of Westminster was prepared, but on the advice of Waugh's friends was not sent.

== Creation ==
=== South American journey ===
In 1932 Waugh embarked on an extended voyage to South America. His decision to absent himself may have been a reaction to his increasingly complicated emotional life; while his passion for Teresa Jungman remained unrequited, he was involved in various unsatisfactory casual sexual liaisons, and was himself being pursued by the much older Hazel Lavery. The choice of South America was probably influenced by Peter Fleming, the literary editor of The Spectator. Fleming had recently returned from an expedition to Brazil seeking traces of Colonel Percy Fawcett who, in 1925, had disappeared in Brazil while searching for a fabled lost city.

Having seen Black Mischief launched to mixed but generally favourable critical comment (Oldmeadow's intervention was not immediate), Waugh sailed from Tilbury on 2 December 1932. He arrived in British Guiana on 23 December, and after some days of indecision opted to accompany the district commissioner for Rupununi on a journey into the interior. He hoped that he might reach Manaus, a large city deep within the Brazilian jungle, but transport proved unreliable, and he got no further than the town of Boa Vista in Brazil. On the way, at one of his overnight stopping points, he encountered Mr Christie, an elderly mixed-race settler who greeted him by saying, "I was expecting you. I was warned in a vision of your approach". The two enjoyed an agreeable dinner together, where Christie talked of the "Fifth Kingdom" (a biblical prophecy from the Book of Daniel). He told Waugh that he had seen the entire gathering of the saints in heaven—surprisingly few, he said—but could not count them because they were incorporeal. Waugh added Christie to his "treasury of eccentrics", set aside for future literary use.

=== "The Man Who Liked Dickens" ===
Waugh arrived at Boa Vista on 4 February 1933, to find no boats available to take him on to Manaus. Days of inactivity and boredom followed, with "nothing to read except some lives of the Saints in French and Bossuet's sermons". Waugh passed some of the time by writing a short story; although not identified in the diaries, this story has been generally accepted as "The Man Who Liked Dickens". (Note: Hastings observes that Waugh's diaries date the writing of the story to between 12–14 February. She believes that although Waugh may have begun the story in Boa Vista, it unlikely that a story of this length and complexity could be completed in two days and notes that story incorporates events that occurred after Waugh left Boa Vista. For example, on his way back from Boa Vista Waugh spent eight days at the St Ignatius Mission in Bon Success, where he records that he found novels by Dickens in the Mission library, and read Dombey and Son and Nicholas Nickleby "with avid relish".) Apart from using different names and some minor details, this 1933 story is the same as the episode that Waugh used the next year as chapter VI, "Du Côté de Chez Todd", of A Handful of Dust: an elderly settler (modelled in manner, speech and appearance on Christie), rescues and holds captive a lost explorer and requires him, if he wishes to eat, to read aloud the novels of Dickens, in perpetuity. The story was published in 1933, in America in Hearst's International–Cosmopolitan, and in Britain in Nash's Pall Mall Magazine. In an article written many years later, Waugh explained how the story became the basis for his next novel: "The idea [for the short story] came quite naturally from the experience of visiting a lonely settler [Christie] ... and reflecting how easily he could hold me prisoner. Then, after the short story was written and published, the idea kept working in my mind. I wanted to discover how the prisoner got there, and eventually the thing grew into a study of other sorts of savage at home and the civilized man’s helpless plight among them."

=== Writing and title history ===
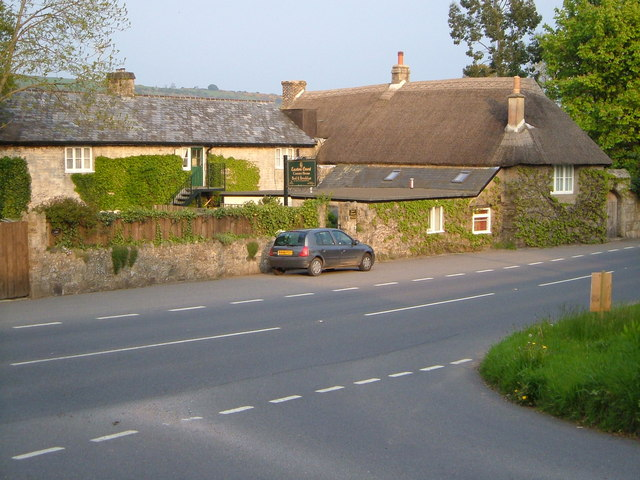
The Easton Court Hotel, Chagford, where Waugh finished writing A Handful of Dust in spring, 1934

On his return to England in May 1933, Waugh, short of cash, had to complete numerous writing commitments before he could begin work on the projected novel. In October–November he wrote his account of the South American journey, which he called Ninety-two Days. He then went to Fez in Morocco, to begin the novel in warmth and solitude. In January he wrote to Mary Lygon, reporting that he had written 18,500 words of "my filthy novel", and later he told Katharine Asquith: "I have just killed a little boy at a lawn meet & made his mother commit adultery ... so perhaps you won't like it after all". By 10 February he had reached the half-way point—45,000 words—but was uncertain how the story should proceed, and returned to England at the end of February with most of the second half unwritten. He finished the book at the Easton Court Hotel at Chagford, in Devon, a regular retreat that he used when completing writing projects. By mid-April the book was with his publishers, Chapman & Hall, and Waugh was busy correcting the proofs.

Waugh's agent, A. D. Peters, sold the pre-publication serialisation rights to the American monthly magazine Harper's Bazaar. Because the "Mr Todd" episode had been published as a short story the previous year, for the purposes of the serialisation Waugh provided an alternative ending. In this, the whole Brazilian adventure was replaced by a brief coda, in which Tony returns from a luxury cruise to be greeted by a chastened Brenda asking to be reconciled. Tony agrees, but, unknown to her, he decides to keep her London flat for his own purposes. Waugh's biographer Selina Hastings describes this ending as "artistically far more complementary" than that used in the book version; an earlier biographer, Christopher Sykes, thought that had this alternative been retained in the book version, the novel would not have acquired its later distinction.

In March 1933 Waugh wrote to Peters from Chagford to say that he intended to call the novel A Handful of Ashes. This title was disliked by Harpers; an alternative, Fourth Decade, was also considered and rejected. Finally, the story was serialised under the title A Flat in London, and the chosen book title was A Handful of Dust—taken from a line in T. S. Eliot's poem The Waste Land: "I will show you fear in a handful of dust." The line is within the section of the poem entitled "The Burial of the Dead", which depicts a comfortless, lifeless land of desert and rubble, reflecting the empty moral ambience of the novel. (Note: In his introduction to the 1997 Penguin edition of A Handful of Dust, Robert Murray Davis argues that the novel's vision is bleaker than that of the poem, the last lines of which suggest some hope of future salvation. The novel, says Davis, "rejects even that faint consolation".) The title phrase had been used earlier by Joseph Conrad in the story "Youth"; by Tennyson in Maud; and by John Donne in his Meditations.

== Themes ==
=== Autobiographical ===
In his study of Waugh's literary life, David Wykes describes A Handful of Dust as "a courageous and skilful act of fictional autobiography", driven by the trauma of the writer's divorce without which, Wykes maintains, the book would not have been written. Waugh, says his biographer Martin Stannard, was "dredging the memory of his personal agony" in documenting the breakdown of the Lasts' marriage. The critic Cyril Connolly, whose first reaction to the work had been negative, later called it "the only book which understands the true horror of the withdrawal of affection in an affair from [the point of view of] the innocent party".

Wykes believes that, of the novel's three central characters, only Tony is representative of his real-life equivalent—Waugh in his pre-Catholic irreligious state. Brenda is portrayed in the novel as typical of many of the women in Waugh's early stories—well-bred, trivial and faithless—but Wykes argues that she is not a representation of Evelyn Gardner, "neither in inward nor outward qualities". Nor, he asserts, is Beaver intended as an accurate portrayal of Evelyn Gardner's lover, the "dreadful nullity" of Beaver being a form of literary revenge on the erudite Heygate. There is general agreement among commentators that other characters are drawn from life: Mr Todd is clearly based on the eccentric but rather less sinister Mr Christie; Dr Messinger, the incompetent explorer, reflects W. E. Roth, the curator of the Georgetown museum whom Waugh considered accompanying into the jungle, only to be dissuaded by reports of Roth's irresponsibility and disregard of danger. Thérèse de Vitré, the object of Tony's forlorn attempt at a shipboard romance, was named "Bernadette" in the original manuscript; the change was made as a reference to Waugh's platonic friend Teresa Jungman. Thérèse announces her destiny to marry a rich Catholic, and, in an echo of Jungman, recoils from Tony when she discovers that he still has a wife. The culmination of Tony's misfortunes, his enslavement to Mr Todd and Dickens, is foreshadowed in Waugh's life by his father's habit of reading his favourite literature aloud to his family, three or four evenings a week: "most of Shakespeare, most of Dickens, most of Tennyson ... stepping about the room and portraying the characters ... he held us enthralled".

The art historian John Richardson, however, wrote, in the article "Sybil Colefax, Lion Hunter" (House & Garden, September 1983), that the society decorator Lady Colefax "was the model for the deadly decorator, Mrs Beaver (as, allegedly, her son Michael was the model for Mrs Beaver's son John)."

=== Satire and realism ===
"Are [my] books meant to be satirical? No. Satire flourishes in a stable society and presupposes homogeneous standards ... It is aimed at inconsistency and hypocrisy. It exposes polite cruelty and folly by exaggerating them. It seeks to produce shame. All this has no place in the Century of the Common Man where vice no longer pays lip service to virtue."

— Evelyn Waugh in 1946, answering questions from American readers.

Critics and commentators have generally acknowledged that A Handful of Dust stands apart from Waugh's other prewar fiction. Philip Toynbee describes it as a turning point in Waugh's journey from outright satire to disillusioned realism: "Much of this book is in the old manner, funny-preposterous laced with funny-bitter, but the whole tone and atmosphere are violently changed when the little boy is killed". Likewise Gerald Gould in The Observer, reviewing the book's initial publication in 1934: "Here was the old gorgeous, careless note of contempt and disillusionment. Gradually, implacably, the note changes and deepens". A later critic, John Cunningham, recognises that stylistically, the book is in a different category from Waugh's other 1930s novels, both more ambitious and more ambiguous. Although, says Cunningham, "[i]t provokes as much knowing laughter as Waugh's other satires of manners", it is a significant step away from its predecessors, towards the Catholic "comedies of redemption" that would become the principal focus of his writing life.

In his introduction to the 1997 Penguin edition, Robert Murray Davis suggests that in part, the book reflected Waugh's reconsideration of his position as a Catholic writer, in the light of the recent Oldmeadow furore over Black Mischief. He may have developed a more serious tone to pre-empt further criticism from that quarter, although Stannard maintains that Waugh's beginnings as a serious writer date back to 1929, when he was completing Vile Bodies. Waugh's own comment, in 1946, was that he was not, according to his own understanding of the term, a "satirical" writer, and that in writing the book he was merely "trying to distil comedy and sometimes tragedy from the knockabout farce of people's outward behaviour".

William Plomer, writing in The Spectator after the book's first publication, thought it mistaken "to regard Mr Waugh's more surprising situations as farcical or far-fetched; they are on the whole extremely realistic". However, the mixture of genres was not immediately understood or appreciated by some of Waugh's admirers; Connolly's initial thought was that Waugh had been "destroyed as a writer", by snobbery and association with country-house living. In Sykes's view, the fleeting appearances in the book of characters from Waugh's farcical world, such as Lady Metroland, are awkward and intrusive—the world of A Handful of Dust is not outlandish: "Evelyn would have done better to have forgotten Lady Metroland and her world altogether".

=== Religion and humanism ===
Cunningham sees A Handful of Dust as a forerunner of Waugh's later, avowedly Catholic novels. In keeping with Waugh's dismissive attitude to the Church of England, Anglicanism is shown as a farce (Mr Tendril the vicar's sermons), or a nullity (Tony's admission that he had never really thought much about God). Instead, Christianity is evoked by presenting the awfulness of life without it; according to the writer and critic Frank Kermode, "[T]he callousness of incident and the coldness of tone work by suggesting the positive and rational declaration of the Faith". The reader, Stannard says, "is never allowed to forget man's primal bestiality ... God is the key that has been thrown away in this purely secular world". John Raymond in the New Statesman refers to Waugh's "unique type of moral vision", and calls the novel a "powerful twentieth century sermon on the breakdown of a Christian marriage".

Tony's doomed quest in the Brazilian jungle is framed in biblical terms; the relevant chapter title, "In Search of a City" alludes to Hebrews 13:14: "For here we have no continuing city, but we seek one to come". However, Waugh remarked of the novel that it was "humanist, and said all I wanted to say about humanism". He believed that the essential 20th century conflict was between Christianity and Chaos, and chose to present a chaotic world to demonstrate that civilisation did not have in itself the power to survive. Thus, in the Brazilian jungle, Tony encounters what Davis terms "power without grace ... secular feudalism unredeemed by the saving grace of Christianity". Todd is the symbol of humanist, irreligious power.

=== English Gothic ===
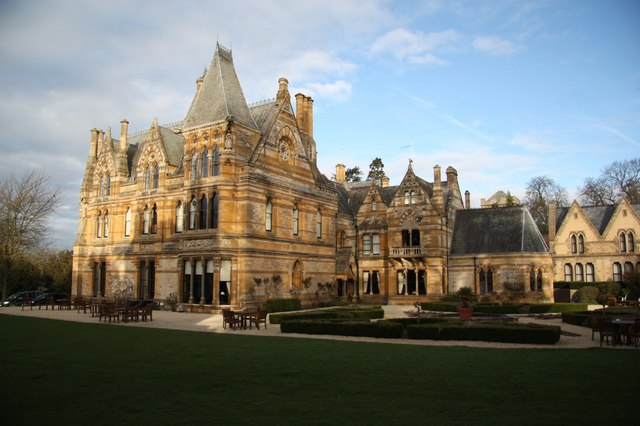
Ettington Park, in Warwickshire, a mid-nineteenth century remodelling of a much earlier house, as was the fictional Hetton

The critic Bernard Bergonzi refers to Tony Last as "a doomed Gothic hero", echoing Waugh's explanation to his friend Henry Yorke that the theme of the book was "a Gothic man in the hands of savages—first Mrs Beaver etc, then the real ones". According to Stannard, Waugh tended to judge a civilisation by its art, and especially by its architecture, and English Gothic is a major leitmotif of the novel. Tony's recognition of the extent of Brenda's betrayal is described as "a whole Gothic world ... come to grief". Later, Tony finds purpose in his otherwise pointless voyage when he hears of the fabled lost city from Messinger; he visualises it as Gothic in character, "a transfigured Hetton ... everything luminous and translucent; a coral citadel crowning a green hill top sown with daisies". When at the end of his quest he first catches sight of Todd's settlement, in his delirium he sees, instead of the reality of mud huts and desolation, "gilded cupolas and spires of alabaster".

Although devoted to original English Gothic, Waugh had mixed views on Gothic Revival architecture, preferring what he called "pre-Ruskin" to the "stodgy" later 19th-century style in which he places Hetton. He instructed the artist responsible for the frontispiece in the first edition of the book to "design the worst possible 1860" style to depict the house. The guidebook description of Hetton which opens the second chapter reveals that, "formerly one of the notable houses of the county, it was entirely rebuilt in 1864 in the Gothic style and is now devoid of interest". Thus, Tony's devotion is shown to be to a false ideal; his deposition and replacement in his domain by middle-class heirs represents what the writer Brigid Brophy terms "a bourgeois sack of a fake-Gothic Rome".

== Publication and reception ==
=== Publication history ===
A Handful of Dust first appeared in Harper's Bazaar, as a serial in five instalments during the summer of 1934, using the alternative, non-Brazilian ending. The complete novel was first published in book form in London, on 4 September 1934, by Chapman and Hall. It was an immediate success with the British public, and within four weeks had reached its fifth impression. In the same month it was issued in New York by Farrar & Rinehart, who were initially unenthusiastic about the book and, according to Waugh's agent, made little promotional effort on its behalf. It has since been published in the United States by (among others) Dell Publishing (1959); Little, Brown (1977); and Barnes and Noble (2001).

Since its first publication the book has remained in print, and has been reproduced in many editions and foreign languages. It was first published as a paperback in 1951, by Penguin, who have reissued it regularly. In 1945 Bernard Grasset published a translation in French, after which the book was published in most European languages, and also in Chinese, Japanese, Korean and Arabic.

=== Critical reception ===
The initial critical response to the book, while largely complimentary in tone, was nevertheless muted and sparse. This relative paucity of attention, Stannard surmises, might have been a consequence of the earlier serialisation, which meant that the essence of the story was well known before the book appeared. The Times Literary Supplement's anonymous reviewer deemed the novel "a study of futility", whose hero is "so incapable of helping himself that he is not worth helping". Peter Quennell in the New Statesman found the story both painful and amusing—"tragedy and comedy are interdependent"—but was not overcome by the bouts of hilarity that had interrupted his reading of earlier novels such as Decline and Fall. If not exhilarating, the book was "certainly the most mature and best written novel that Mr Waugh has yet produced". Plomer's Spectator review described the book as "another of [Waugh's] cultivated pearls", economically written, holding the reader's attention throughout and capturing with precision the moods and rhythms of life as it was lived in certain quarters of society.

The only overtly hostile review was Oldmeadow's in The Tablet, which asserted that, after the disquiet in Catholic circles following the publication of Waugh's previous novel, his co-religionists "reasonably hoped to find Mr Waugh turning over a completely new leaf. He has not done so". The review mixed literary criticism with moral sermonising, to which Waugh felt bound to object publicly. His friend, the journalist Tom Driberg agreed to place a notice in his "William Hickey" column in the Daily Express, in which Waugh accepted fully Oldmeadow's right to criticise the literary quality of the work "in any terms he thinks suitable". However, he added, so far as his moral lecturing was concerned, Oldmeadow was "in the position of a valet masquerading in his master's clothes. Long employment by a prince of the Church has tempted him to ape his superiors, and, naturally enough, he gives an uncouth and impudent performance".

Many of Waugh's friends and admirers gave the book unstinting praise, among them Rebecca West, Lady Diana Cooper, Desmond MacCarthy and Hilaire Belloc. Among those less enthusiastic were the novelist J.B. Priestley, who found the characters lightweight and uninvolving, and the devoutly Catholic Katharine Asquith who thought the writing was brilliant but the subject-matter deeply depressing. The novel's critical standing grew steadily in the years following its publication. In 1942 the American critic Alexander Woollcott chose it as the best English novel in 100 years, a verdict largely endorsed some years later by Frank Kermode. Sykes wrote in 1975 that "there are only five or six novels of this century that can seriously challenge it".

In 2010 Time magazine placed A Handful of Dust in its listing of the hundred best English-language novels published since 1923 (the year the magazine began publication), stating: "If this is Waugh at his bleakest it’s also Waugh at his deepest, most poisonously funny". In the Modern Library's list of 100 best novels, A Handful of Dust is placed 34th in the "Board list", although unplaced in the complementary "Readers' List".

== Adaptations ==
On 8 April 1968 BBC Radio 4 broadcast A Handful of Dust as a radio play, in an adaptation by Denis Constanduros produced by Brian Miller. Jack Watling and Stephanie Beacham played Tony and Brenda Last, with Rex Holdsworth as Mr Todd. A new radio adaptation, with Jonathan Cullen and Tara Fitzgerald in the main roles, was broadcast as a two-part serial in May 1996. In November 1982 an ensemble cast performed the work as a stage play, directed by Mike Alfreds, at the Lyric Theatre, Hammersmith. A film version, directed by Charles Sturridge, was released in 1988, with James Wilby as Tony, Kristin Scott Thomas as Brenda, Judi Dench as Mrs Beaver and Alec Guinness as Mr Todd. (Note: On 3 October 1954 the American television series General Electric Theater screened an adaptation of "The Man Who Liked Dickens", entitled "High Green Wall". Joseph Cotten played the trapped explorer; Ronald Reagan was the series host.)

== Notes and references ==
=== General and cited sources ===
- Amory, Mark, ed. (1995). The Letters of Evelyn Waugh. London: Phoenix. ISBN 1-85799-245-8. (Originally published by Weidenfeld and Nicolson, London 1980)
- Davie, Michael, ed. (1976). The Diaries of Evelyn Waugh. London: Weidenfeld and Nicolson. ISBN 0-297-77126-4.
- Davis, Robert Murray (1997). "Introduction" to E. Waugh: A Handful of Dust. Harmondsworth, UK: Penguin Books. ISBN 0-14-018886-X.
- Fisher, Clive (1995). Cyril Connolly. London: Papermac. ISBN 0-333-64965-6.
- Hastings, Selina (1994). Evelyn Waugh: A biography. London: Sinclair-Stevenson. ISBN 1-85619-223-7.
- Lewis, Jeremy (1998). Cyril Connolly: A Life. London: Pimlico. ISBN 0-7126-6635-4.
- McDonnell, Jacqueline (1985). Waugh on Women. London: Duckworth. ISBN 0-7156-2006-1.
- Slater, Ann Pasternak, ed. (1998). Evelyn Waugh: The Complete Short Stories (Introduction). London: Everyman's. ISBN 1-85715-190-9.
- Stannard, Martin (1993). Evelyn Waugh, Volume I: The Early Years 1903–1939. London: Flamingo. ISBN 0-586-08678-1.
- Stannard, Martin (1984). Evelyn Waugh: The Critical Heritage. London: Routledge. ISBN 0-415-15924-5.
- Sykes, Christopher (1975). Evelyn Waugh: A biography. London: Collins. ISBN 0-00-211202-7.
- Waugh, Evelyn (1934). Ninety-two Days. London: Duckworth. OCLC 504724214.
- Waugh, Evelyn (1997). A Handful of Dust. Harmondsworth, UK: Penguin Books. ISBN 0-14-018886-X.
- Waugh, Evelyn (1983). A Little Learning. Harmondsworth, UK: Penguin Books. ISBN 0-14-006604-7.
- Wykes, David (1999). Evelyn Waugh: A Literary Life. London: Macmillan. ISBN 0-333-61138-1.
