= A Handful of Dust (band) =

- Origin: New Zealand
- Genres: Free noise
- Years active: 1988–present
- Members: Bruce Russell; Alastair Galbraith; Peter Stapleton

A Handful of Dust are a New Zealand free noise band featuring guitarist Bruce Russell, violinist Alastair Galbraith and drummer Peter Stapleton.

== Discography ==
Date of Release	Title	Label	Charted	Country	Catalog Number
1993	Concord LP	Twisted Village/Corpus Hermeticum	-	-	Hermes001
1994	The Philosophick Mercury	Corpus Hermeticum	-	-	Hermes002
1994	The Eightness of Adam Qadmon	Corpus Hermeticum	-	-	Hermes003
1994	Musica Humana	Corpus Hermeticum	-	-	Hermes004
1994	The Seventhness	Corpus Hermeticum	-	-	Hermes005
1994	Three Dances in Honour of Sabbatai Sevi, The Apostate Messiah	Corpus Hermeticum	-	-	Hermes006
1995	From a Soundtrack to the Anabase of St. John Perse	Corpus Hermeticum	-	-	Hermes009
1996	Now Gods, Stand Up For Bastards	Corpus Hermeticum	-	-	Hermes013
1996	Topology of a Phantom City	Corpus Hermeticum	-	-	Hermes020
1997	Spiritual Libertines	Crank Automative	-	-	
1998	Jerusalem, Street of Graves	Corpus Hermeticum	-	-	Hermes029
2000	From a Soundtrack to the Anabase of St. John Perse (reissue)	Bluesilver	-	-	
2002	For Patti Smith	FreewaySound	-	-	
2003	Mares' Milk Mixed With Blood	Non Mi Piace	-	-	07
2008	Now Gods, Stand Up For Bastards/The Philosophik Mercury (reissue)	No Fun Productions	-	-	NFP34
2009	Panegyric	Next Best Way	-	-	NBWAY08
