= Kim Pieters =

New Zealand artist

- Born: 1959 (age 66–67); Rotorua, New Zealand
- Years active: 1981-current
- Known for: Artist

Kim Pieters (born 1959) is a New Zealand painter, musician and digital filmmaker.

== Background ==
Born in Rotorua, New Zealand, she was the eldest of six children and grew up on the Bombay Hills. In the early 1980s, she led a peripatetic life, travelling to Australia and around New Zealand. She moved to Christchurch in the late 1980s and, without any significant formal training, "devoted herself to her art practice". She held her first exhibition of photographs and drawings in Wellington in 1981, and her first painting exhibition at the Canterbury Society of Arts Gallery in 1989. In 1993, along with others such as the musician Peter Stapleton, she relocated to Dunedin where she participated in the city's "‘free noise’ scene", and was instrumental in establishing the Metonymic record label (1996) and the experimental film and music festival Lines of Flight (2000). She took up residence in her current studio near the Dunedin waterfront in 2007, which initiated "an especially concentrated period of painting".

== Work ==
Involved in a number of different media, and a long-standing fixture on the experimental music scene, she, nonetheless, describes painting as her "ultimate life choice". The origins of this choice date back to when, as a child of ten, she was encouraged by her aunt to make images as an afternoon project. Pieters recalls this moment as a "numinous" experience. "Making a picture" creates a state of mind, in her words, in which "everything falls away." She explains that "[p]ainting is where my attention is completely absorbed....I am happiest when I am painting." She elaborates: "When I paint I am looking to hold the unsayable....For me, abstraction is intimately tied to ideas of experience and language. The most curious, the most wonderful thing – but perhaps also the most terrifying – is that which we can’t name. This is where everything begins for me."

== Critical reception ==
Pieters won the Waikato Museum’s National Contemporary Art Award in 2017 for her painting "The Meaning of Ethics" (2017, mixed media on board). Elizabeth Caldwell, director of the City Gallery in Wellington and judge for the award commented: "The work draws on a tradition of stylistic abstract painting. As a judge, one of the things I look for is originality and a signature style. Kim Pieters is an artist who uses her own vocabulary of gestures in her art-making. She has got complete mastery of her craft."

Pieters' work has been widely exhibited in New Zealand in galleries such as: Artspace NZ (2012), the Adam Art Gallery (2014), Inge Doesburg Gallery (2016), the Dunedin Public Art Gallery (2018), Bowerbank Ninow (2016, 2018) and RDS Gallery (2019).
