= Ba Da Bing Records =

American record label

- Founded: 1994
- Founder: Ben Goldberg
- Genre: Pop, rock
- Country of origin: U.S.
- Location: Brooklyn, New York
- Official website: badabingrecords.com

Ba Da Bing Records is an American record label based in Brooklyn, New York. The name is derived from the saying "ba da bing, ba da boom", common among Italian-Americans, especially in New Jersey.

The label was founded in Leonia, New Jersey, in 1994 by Ben Goldberg. Goldberg ran the operation from a post office box while taking positions as a publicist for the independent labels Merge and Matador. In 2007, Goldberg moved the label's base to Brooklyn in the Fort Greene neighborhood.

One of the label's most successful acts is the group Beirut, whose debut album Ba Da Bing released in 2006.

== Artists ==
- Arc Iris
- ÄSS
- Julie Byrne
- Ben Chatwin
- Colossal Yes
- Richard Conway-Jones
- Cousins
- Claire Cronin
- Cross Record
- Damon & Naomi
- The Dead C
- The Eagle Rock Gospel Singers
- Earth Jerks
- Eye
- Family Underground
- Jackson C. Frank
- Gate
- Jenn Grant
- A Handful of Dust
- Cassandra Jenkins
- Hamish Kilgour
- Hawthonn
- Wendy Eisenberg
- Peter Kolovos
- Lady Lamb
- Martin Sagadin
- La Morte Young
- Jenks Miller & Rose Cross, NC
- David Nance
- Natural Snow Buildings
- Ora Iso
- Our Love Will Destroy the World
- The Renderers
- Sarah Davachi
- Slothrust
- Soft Landing
- Kane Strang
- Talk Talk/Mark Hollis
- The Terminals
- Threes and Will
- Tiny Ruins
- Trigger
- Katie Von Schleicher
- The Veils
- warrior
- Woom
- youbet
- Richard Youngs

Former

- 1 Mile North
- Asher White
- Beirut
- Yume Bitsu
- Blek Ink
- Bright
- The Brunettes
- Patrick Cleandenim
- Comets on Fire
- Adrian Crowley
- Mark Dwinell
- Th' Faith Healers
- Alger Hiss
- Mark Hollis
- Essie Jain
- James Orr Complex
- Juneau
- Landing
- Mirza
- Monaural
- Jason Morphew
- Park Attack
- The Receptionists
- Xenia Rubinos
- Salteen
- Sharon Van Etten
- Shearwater
- Six Organs of Admittance
- Sons & Daughters
- The Spiny Anteaters
- Tune-Yards
- Ultrasound
- The Weak Moments
- Greg Weeks
- Benjamin Wetherill
- Devon Williams
- Windy & Carl
- Hawksley Workman
- Yours Truly
