= Siltbreeze =

Philadelphia independent record label

- Founded: 1989
- Founder: Tony Lax
- Genre: Experimental rock, noise rock, slacker rock, lo-fi music, shitgaze
- Country of origin: United States
- Location: Philadelphia

Siltbreeze is an American independent record label based in Philadelphia. It is known for its eclectic roster of artists and releases of experimental, noise, folk, and rock-based music. Founded in 1989 by Ohio native Tom Lax, the label evolved out of a zine of the same name which he published from 1987 until 1992. The first label release was a Halo of Flies EP, and soon after, Lax produced a steady stream of record releases by the Dead C, the Gibson Bros., Sebadoh, the Strapping Fieldhands, Harry Pussy, Jim Shepard, and Mike Rep among others throughout the early and mid 1990s.

The label slowed its output toward the later 1990s. Though it was revived in the mid-to-late 2000s by the shitgaze scene which encompassed a new crop of artists such as Times New Viking, Sic Alps, Pink Reason, Psychedelic Horseshit, U.S. Girls, and Eat Skull.

== Roster ==
- 1929
- A Band
- Above Ground
- A Handful of Dust
- Alasehir
- Amanda X
- Ashtabula
- Ashtray Navigations
- Axemen
- Bardo Pond
- Beyond The Implode
- Blank Realm
- Blues Control
- Bren't Lewiis Ensemble
- Brother JT & Vibrolux
- Sarah Mary Chadwick
- Charalambides
- Chickens
- Circle Pit
- Constant Mongrel
- The Dead C
- Doozer
- Eat Skull
- Eraser
- Ex-Cocaine
- Fabulous Diamonds
- Factums
- Famous Mammals
- Far-Out Fangtooth
- Mark Feehan
- Alastair Galbraith
- Gas
- Gate
- Gibson Bros
- Hall Of Fame
- Halo of Flies
- Hank IV
- Harry Pussy
- Kitchen's Floor
- Kito Mizukumi Rouber
- Alan Licht
- Little Claw
- Lloyd Pack
- Love Is So Fast
- Angus Maclise
- The Mad Scene
- Mantles
- Max Block
- Dan Melchior
- Monkey 101
- Roy Montgomery
- Mount Carmel
- Naked On The Vague
- Oper'azione Nafta
- People Skills
- The Pin Group
- Pink Reason
- Puffy Areolas
- Psychedelic Horseshit
- Queen Meanie Puss
- Ratas Del Vaticano
- Mike Rep & The Quotas
- The Renderers
- Letha Rodman-Melchior
- Bruce Russell
- Sam Esh & Hard Black Thing
- Sandoz Lab Technicians
- Sapat
- Sebadoh
- Scorched Earth Policy
- Shadow Ring
- Sic Alps
- Jim Shepard
- Shimmy Rivers and Canal
- Strapping Fieldhands
- Sunshine Super Scum
- Temple Of Bon Matin
- Teenage Panzerkorps (aka Der TPK)
- The Terminals
- Thomas Jefferson Slave Apartments
- Times New Viking
- Titmachine
- Tower Recordings
- Tropa Macaca
- Tyvek
- Un
- U.S. Girls
- Vacuum
- V-3
- Venom P. Stinger
- Vertical Slit
- Victor Dimisich Band
- Watery Love
- xNOBBQx
- Yips

== See also ==
- List of record labels
- Siltbreeze Records artists
