= Bruce Russell (musician) =

New Zealand musician

Bruce Russell (born 1960) is a New Zealand experimental musician and writer.

He is a founding member and guitarist of the noise rock trio The Dead C and the free noise combo A Handful of Dust (with Alastair Galbraith). He has released solo albums featuring guitar and tape manipulation, and has contributed articles to British music magazine The Wire.

He established the Xpressway record label, which was active from 1985 until the early 1990s, releasing mostly cassettes and a few records. Russell then founded the Corpus Hermeticum record label. Xpressway released only music by New Zealanders, usually song-based. Corpus Hermeticum releases, in contrast, may feature New Zealand or international artists, and they eschew song forms in favour of free-form, experimental, usually improvised sounds.

In summer of 2013, Bruce Russell's daughter Olive Russell uploaded a documentary of her father that she shot and edited herself called "27 Minutes with Mr. Noisy: A Documentary about Bruce Russell" to Vimeo.com.

== Trivia ==
During his time at the University of Otago, Bruce Russell was a member of that university's champion team in the television quiz University Challenge.

During the South African Springbok rugby team's controversial 1981 tour of New Zealand, Russell received two police convictions as a student leader of protests against the tour.

For a period Russell worked as an archivist in Radio New Zealand's Sound Archives.

== Discography ==
- Project for a Revolution in New York
- Maximalist Mantra Music (Crank Automotive car08)
- Painting the Passports Brown
- Sights (with Ralf Wehowsky) (Corpus Hermeticum HERMES041)
- Birchville Cat Motel & Bruce Russell (with Birchville Cat Motel)
- Midnight Crossroads Tape Recorder Blues (with Ralf Wehowsky)
- 21st Century Field Hollers and Prison Songs (w.m.o/r26, 2006)
- Antikythera Mechanism (The Spring Press)
- Virginia Plane (with Lasse Marhaug) (The Spring Press)
- The Movement of the Free Spirit (The Spring Press)
- Noh Budokan!! (Absorb)

== Bibliography ==
- Bruce Russell, Left-handed blows: writing on sound, 1993–2009 (Auckland: Clouds, 2010) ISBN 978-0-9582981-4-8
- Bruce Russell (ed.), Erewhon Calling: Experimental Sound in New Zealand (Auckland: Audio Foundation/CMR, 2012) ISBN 978-0-473-21766-2
