= Michael Morley (musician) =

New Zealand musician

Michael Morley is an experimental musician and visual artist from New Zealand.

Morley sings and plays guitar and laptop as a member of The Dead C, but also records on his own (and with collaborators) as Gate. Earlier, in the 1980s, Morley was a member of Wreck Small Speakers on Expensive Stereos.

Morley founded the Precious Metal label sometime in the late 1980s to document, first on cassette and later LP and CD, his own work as Gate. Most of the releases on Precious Metal were limited to very small quantities.

Morley currently teaches at Otago Polytechnic School of Art in Dunedin.

== Discography ==
a partial Gate discography;
title, format, label, country

- Fear of Music. CS (Precious Metal, NZ)
- Metric. CS (Precious Metal, NZ)
- Hate. CS (Precious Metal, NZ)
- Cropped Silver Hi Lo. CS (Precious Metal, NZ)
- Trance. CS (Precious Metal, NZ)
- Cachian. CS (Precious Metal, NZ)
- 1994. LP (Precious Metal, NZ)
- Guitar. LP (Majora, USA)
- Amerika. LP (Majora, USA)
- Metric. LP (Majora, USA)
- The Dew Line. CD (Table of the Elements, USA)
- Golden. CD (IMD, NZ) a singles collection
- My Dear Sweet Reluctant Sweetheart. 2xCD (Hells Half Halo, USA)
- The Wisher Table. CD (Precious Metal, NZ)
- The Monolake. CD (Table of the Elements, USA)
- The Lavender Head. 2xLP (Precious Metal, NZ)
- The Lavender Head. 2xLP (Hells Half Halo, USA) Reissue
- The Lavender Head v.3. CD (Precious Metal, NZ)
- Lounge. CD (Twisted Village, USA)
- Live in Boston, NYC 1994. CD (Poon Village, USA)
- 3M. 7" (Toneschacht, Ger)
- "Prophet" / "Rebel". 7" (Siltbreeze, USA)
- "Sunshine" / "Ives". 7" (Twisted Village, USA)
- "Trig" / "Tonken". 7" lathe (Precious Metal, NZ)
- I.O.M (1967-1992). 7" lathe (Precious Metal, NZ)
- Julian Dashper Gate Experience (Parts 1–4). 7" lathe (Precious Metal, NZ)
- 577 Crash / Latent HM Rights (Part 2/Part 3). 7" lathe (Precious Metal, NZ)
