= That That Is ... Is (Not) =

Studio album by Dissolve
- Released: 1995
- Genre: Psychedelic rock
- Length: 43:01
- Label: Kranky

Dissolve chronology
That That Is ... Is (Not) (1995)	Third Album for the Sun (1997)

Professional ratings
Review scores
Source	Rating
AllMusic	4/5 stars

That That Is ... Is (Not) is the debut album of Dissolve, released in 1995 through Kranky.

== Track listing ==
All tracks are written by Chris Heaphy and Roy Montgomery.

No.	Title	Length
1.	"Strand"	4:46
2.	"8 Wire"	3:40
3.	"Dissong"	6:09
4.	"3 Films"	5:23
5.	"Blurred"	4:10
6.	"The Mortal Pleasure of Wanda Lust"	4:44
7.	"Encounter"	7:49
8.	"See the World"	4:54
9.	"S.T.P.P"	1:26

== Personnel ==
- Chris Heaphy – guitar
- Roy Montgomery – guitar
