= Dissolve (band) =

Musical duo from New Zealand

- Origin: Christchurch, Canterbury, New Zealand
- Genres: Post-rock, psychedelic rock
- Years active: 1993–1997
- Labels: Kranky
- Past members: Chris Heaphy; Roy Montgomery

Dissolve is a collaborative musical project between experimental guitarists Chris Heaphy and Roy Montgomery. The two musicians formed a bond over an interest in film soundtracks and creating mood pieces, as opposed to performing in a rock band. They began recording with each other in 1993 after Montgomery's former band Dadamah parted ways. They released two albums under the name Dissolve, That That Is ... Is (Not) in 1995 and Third Album for the Sun in 1997. Heaphy and Montgomery collaborated a final time on the album True, released in 1999.

== Discography ==
- That That Is ... Is (Not) (1995, Kranky)
- Third Album for the Sun (1997, Kranky)
