= Amanita (disambiguation) =

Amanita is a genus of mushrooms.

Amanita may also refer to:

- Amanita (album), a 1996 album by Bardo Pond
- Amanita Design, a video game development company
- Amanita Nightshade, a Monster High character
- Amanita "Neets" Caplan, a Sense8 character
