= You Are What You =

You Are What You may refer to:

- You Are What You Eat, a dieting TV programme aired on British broadcasting company Channel 4, and presented by Gillian McKeith
- You Are What You Eat (film), 1968 American counterculture semi-documentary movie by Barry Feinstein
- You Are What You Eat (disambiguation), other uses of the term
- You Are What You Is, 1981 double album in 1981, later a 20-song CD both by Frank Zappa
- "You Are What You Is" (song), title song from above album
- "You Are What You Love", single by Jenny Lewis and The Watson Twins from the 2006 album Rabbit Fur Coat
- You Are What You Love, an album by Canadian singer-songwriter Melanie Doane
