= Far In =

Studio album by Helado Negro
- Released: October 22, 2021
- Studio: Island Universe Space (Brooklyn, New York); Marfa Recording Company (Marfa, Texas); 411 (Brooklyn, New York); Frowndale (Wayne County, Pennsylvania); Heard City (New York City, New York); Funkhaus (Berlin, Germany)
- Length: 68:35
- Label: 4AD
- Producer: Roberto Carlos Lange

Helado Negro chronology
This Is How You Smile (2019)	Far In (2021)	Phasor (2024)

Far In is a studio album by American musician Roberto Carlos Lange under the name Helado Negro. It was released on October 22, 2021, through 4AD. It received universal acclaim from critics.

== Background ==
Roberto Carlos Lange, also known as Helado Negro, is an American record producer and singer-songwriter. Far In is his first album since This Is How You Smile (2019). It features contributions from Kacy Hill, Buscabulla, and Benamin. It was released on October 22, 2021, through 4AD.

== Critical reception ==
Professional ratings
Aggregate scores
Source	Rating
Metacritic	86/100
Review scores
Source	Rating
AllMusic	4.5/5 stars
Beats Per Minute	84%
Crack	8/10
The Guardian	4/5 stars
Loud and Quiet	7/10
Mojo	4/5 stars
Pitchfork	8.0/10
PopMatters	8/10
Slant Magazine	4/5
Uncut	9/10

According to the review aggregator Metacritic, Far In received "universal acclaim" based on a weighted average score of 86 out of 100 from 8 critic scores.

Tayyab Amin of The Guardian described the album as "a collection of quietly shimmering songs that demand to be played loud." Zara Hedderman of Loud and Quiet wrote, "A vibe-heavy record, it's extremely successful in making its audience feel welcome from its boundless warmth." Heather Phares of AllMusic stated, "Tour de force might be too weighty a term for an album so seemingly effortless, but from its unhurried flow to its wealth of songs, Far In is a glorious showcase for all the aspects of Helado Negro's music."

=== Accolades ===
Year-end lists for Far In
Publication	List	Rank	Ref.
AllMusic	AllMusic Best of 2021	—	
Beats Per Minute	BPM's Top 50 Albums of 2021	14	
NPR	NPR Music's 50 Best Albums of 2021	12	
Pitchfork	The 50 Best Albums of 2021	46	
PopMatters	The 75 Best Albums of 2021	39	
Slant Magazine	The 50 Best Albums of 2021	34	

== Track listing ==
All tracks are written by Roberto Carlos Lange.

Far In track listing
No.	Title	Length
1.	"Wake Up Tomorrow" (featuring Kacy Hill)	3:54
2.	"Gemini and Leo"	4:27
3.	"Purple Tones"	3:26
4.	"There Must Be a Song Like You"	4:50
5.	"Aguas Frías"	3:44
6.	"Aureole"	6:48
7.	"Hometown Dream"	5:34
8.	"Agosto" (featuring Buscabulla)	4:44
9.	"Outside the Outside"	5:12
10.	"Brown Fluorescence"	1:38
11.	"Wind Conversations"	4:44
12.	"Thank You For Ever"	5:07
13.	"La Naranja"	5:30
14.	"Telescope" (featuring Benamin)	4:52
15.	"Mirror Talk"	4:07
Total length:		68:35

== Personnel ==
Credits adapted from liner notes.

- Roberto Carlos Lange – instruments, voice, production, engineering, mixing, photography

Additional instrumentation

- Kacy Hill – vocals (1)
- Opal Hoyt – vocals, piano, synthesizer (1, 2)
- Jason Trammell – drums (1–4, 6, 9, 12, 13)
- Nathaniel Morgan – flute, alto saxophone, clarinet (2, 4, 7, 11, 12)
- Jenn Wasner – electric bass (2, 6)
- Indre Jurgeleviciute – steel pan (3)
- Juan Tapia – field recordings, drum machine (3)
- Bert Cools – electric bass, guitar, synthesizer (3, 15)
- Angela Morris – tenor saxophone, violin (4, 7, 11, 12)
- Maria Grand – bass clarinet (5)
- Kalia Vandever – trombone (6)
- Marco Buccelli – drums (7)
- Carlos Arevalo – guitar (7)
- Taja Cheek – electric bass, guitar (7, 9, 13)
- Oliver Hill – electric bass, viola (7, 11)
- Raquel Berrios – vocals (8)
- Luis Del Valle – bass guitar (8)
- John Herndon – drums (8)
- Kelly Moran – piano (11)
- Chris DeVoe – Rhodes piano (11)
- Savannah Harris – drums (11, 14)
- Jan St. Werner – electronics (12)
- Benjamin Julia – vocals, percussion, bass, guitar (14)
- Kristi Sword – ambience (14)
- Shara Nova – vocals (15)
- William Tyler – guitar (15)
- Shahzad Ismaily – guitar (15)
- Kyle Resnick – trumpet (15)
- Matt Crum – percussion (15)

Strings

- Trey Pollard – strings arrangement, strings conducting (1, 2, 13, 15)
- Ellen Cockerhan, Adrian Pintea, Alison Hall, Jeannette Jang, Naima Burrs, Stacy Matthew, Treesa Gold, Meredith Riley – violin (1, 2, 13, 15)
- Kim Ryan, Johanna Beaver, Molly Sharp – viola (1, 2, 13, 15)
- Peter Greydanus, Stephanie Barrett, Schuyler Slack – cello (1, 2, 13, 15)

Technical personnel

- Keith Reynaud – additional engineering (2–5, 8)
- Gory Smelley – additional engineering (15)
- Rachel Alina – mastering
- Crystal Zapata – design, layout
- Emily Mello – additional text
