= Dilate (Bardo Pond album) =

Studio album by Bardo Pond
- Released: April 24, 2001
- Recorded: October 1998 – October 2000
- Studio: The Lemur House, Philadelphia, PA
- Genre: Space rock; psychedelic rock; noise rock; shoegaze; stoner rock; post-rock; drone
- Length: 71:41
- Label: Matador Records
- Producer: Michael Gibbons and Bardo Pond

Bardo Pond chronology
Set and Setting (1999)	Dilate (2001)	On the Ellipse (2003)

Professional ratings
Aggregate scores
Source	Rating
Metacritic	82/100
Review scores
Source	Rating
AllMusic	4.5/5 stars
Alternative Press	4/5
Entertainment Weekly	B+
Mojo	4/5 stars
NME	4/5 stars
Pitchfork Media	7.5/10

Dilate is the fifth studio album by Bardo Pond. It was released on April 24, 2001, on Matador Records.

== Reception ==
Like its predecessors, Dilate has received highly positive reviews from critics upon release. It has a Metacritic score of 82 based on 10 reviews indicating "[u]niversal acclaim". AllMusic picked the album as the best in the band's discography, with Heather Phares writing that it "cuts through the dense, smoky haze of Set and Setting and Lapsed to deliver its most refined collection to date. [...] Bardo Pond's roaring guitars, trippy flutes, and pummeling drums are all still in place, but now the group uses them sparingly instead of in heroic doses. Indeed, the album's best moments mix equally vast amounts of noise and space, giving Dilate an appropriately expansive feel." In a similarly positive review, Billboard magazine noted that the album "has more in common with avant-jazz and contemporary classical than with most heavy rock" & called it "out of step with today's reigning popular culture". Describing the sound of the album as a combination of Kyuss and Spacemen 3, Noel Gardner of NME gave the album 4 stars out of 5, praising the band's "predilection for taking potentially horrid elements and dragging them off to a place of rare beauty. In the end, you gleefully submit to random moments of extreme-pressure heaviosity like ‘Sunrise’: vocalist Isobel Sollenberger repeatedly sighing “Watch it haaaappen” like the millennial Grace Slick of non sequiturs she unquestionably is." "While it isn't quite as glorious as Lapsed, Dilate does offer a good deal of interesting material" wrote Brendan Reid of Pitchfork, who noted the album's "looser, more spontaneous feel" & praised the band's risk-taking. Sean Palmerston of Exclaim! compared the "remarkable" album to "the heavier guitar-based bands of their first wave of German Krautrock." "Equal parts spaced-out folk, riff-heavy psychedelia, and ambient experimentation," wrote Lawrence Daniel Caswell for Cleveland Scene, "Dilate surpasses Bardo Pond's earlier albums in both beauty and scope and, without resorting to mere studio trickery, features the kind of attention to sonic detail that too few guitar-based groups attempt these days."

The album received some mixed reviews as well. Peter Margasak wrote for Chicago Reader: "sometimes they sound downright clunky, but sometimes their labor pays off: the violin playing of Isobel Sollenberger (whose singing lately sounds nearly as dyspeptic as Jennifer Herrema's) may be rudimentary at best, but it blends nicely with the acidic wash of electric and acoustic guitars played by John and Michael Gibbons." G.C.Weeks of Comes with a Smile wrote that "[t]he band seem no longer to have anything new or interesting to impart. What's more, they have abandoned the melodic ideas that so perfectly crystallised their spaced intentions on previous efforts. With Dilate, one track ambles into the next, with little to distinguish what is being, has been, or will be said. And when you've heard it all before, what reason is there to stick around to hear it again, rehashed and without half the enthusiasm or vigour of days past?"

== Track listing ==
=== CD track listing ===
1. "Two Planes – 7:26
2. "Sunrise" – 5:26
3. "Inside" – 11:43
4. "Aphasia" – 6:02
5. "Favorite Uncle" – 5:58
6. "Swig" – 4:22
7. "Despite the Roar" – 7:07
8. "Lb." – 8:31
9. "Hum" – 3:43
10. "Ganges" – 11:23

=== Vinyl track listing ===
Side A

1. "Two Planes – 7:26
2. "Sunrise" – 5:26
3. "Despite the Roar" – 7:07

Side B

1. "Inside" – 11:43
2. "Aphasia" – 6:02

Side C

1. "Favorite Uncle" – 5:58
2. "Swig" – 4:22
3. "Lb." – 8:31

Side D

1. "Summerflux" – 4:19 (bonus track)
2. "Hum" – 3:43
3. "Ganges" – 11:23

== Personnel ==
- Isobel Sollenberger – Vocals, Flute, Violin
- John Gibbons – Guitars, Synthesizer, Percussion
- Michael Gibbons – Guitars, Producer
- Clint Takeda – Bass
- John Culver – Farfisa organ ("Two Planes", "Inside"), Drums ("Sunrise")
- Ed Farnsworth – Drums (except "Sunrise)
- Greg Calbi – Mastering
