= Amanita (album) =

Studio album by Bardo Pond
- Released: April 3, 1996
- Studio: Studio Red, Philadelphia, PA
- Genre: Space rock; psychedelic rock; noise rock; shoegaze; post-rock; drone
- Length: 74:11 (CD/cassette); 81:45 (vinyl)
- Label: Matador; Drunken Fish
- Producer: Bardo Pond; J. Cox

Bardo Pond chronology
Bufo Alvarius (1995)	Amanita (1996)	Lapsed (1997)

Amanita is the second studio album by American rock band Bardo Pond, released on April 3, 1996. It was released as a single CD and cassette on Matador Records, their first release on the label, and as a double vinyl LP on Drunken Fish Records with two bonus tracks. Counting their four early self-released cassettes, this is the band's sixth or seventh album, but is generally viewed as their third officially-released album.

== Background ==
The album title refers to the highly toxic mushroom genus Amanita, a few of which have hallucinogenic properties. (The pre-release cassette was entitled The High Frequency, causing the album to occasionally still be called this.) "RM" is named after one of the band's father figures and collaborators (as Hash Jar Tempo), New Zealand guitarist Roy Montgomery.

A Drunken Fish mail-order catalog described the album thus:

As the resin oozes on, sticking everything in its path to the couch, Bardo stumbles into the 2nd phase of a full length zone-out. Limp-lidded guitars are in more abundance than ever, courses are being plotted with the controls set for the heart of the bowl, and somewhere deep inside a 'rock' band has emerged... however baked it may be.

The album was recorded at Studio Red.

== Reception ==
Professional ratings
Review scores
Source	Rating
AllMusic	4.5/5 stars
Alternative Press	5/5
Pitchfork	8.0/10
Record Collector	5/5 stars

Amanita was very well received. Alternative Press gave the album a perfect score, while Ned Raggett, reviewing the album for AllMusic, described it as "stunning", "astonishing" & "inspiring", noting that their sound hadn't changed "all that much" despite "whipping up just as compelling a mix of drone, volume, and blissout as before". Similarly positive was Deborah Sprague of Trouser Press, who noted the shorter song lengths in comparison to their previous album, writing: "The free-form guitar scrawls of “Limerick” and “Tantric Porno” refract chaos in much the same way prog-rock forefathers like Ash Ra Tempel did — but by compacting the commotion into four- and five-minute bursts and all but eliminating passages of blissed-out trance, Bardo Pond makes sure not to lose control of the universe it has created."

=== Legacy ===
In his book Gimme Indie Rock, Andrew Earles wrote of the album's "wide-ranging influence, blowing minds within the more adventurous indie rock-based realms [...] reaching into the then-blooming stoner-metal (or stoner-rock) scene, and establishing a historical milestone for today's right-headed bands that were too young the first time around." In 2016, Pitchfork ranked it the 28th greatest shoegaze album of all time, writing that "[g]uitarists and brothers Michael and John Gibbons uncoil blasted-out lines that instinctively channel what the 1960s psychedelic godfathers 13th Floor Elevators called “the third voice.” Here, Bardo Pond find their power in churning jam structures, the kind that suggest someone left Neil Young and Crazy Horse in a barn and returned a few days later to find them still going, their jangle pleasantly warped." Stuart Braithwaite of Mogwai considers it to be his favourite Bardo Pond album, describing it as "one huge piece of music".

== Track listing ==
All lyrics written by Isobel Sollenberger; all music composed by Bardo Pond (Isobel Sollenberger, Michael Gibbons, John Gibbons, Clint Takeda, and Joe Culver).

CD and cassette editions

1. "Limerick" – 10:21
2. "Sentence" – 5:08
3. "Tantric Porno" – 6:13
4. "Wank" – 5:28
5. "The High Frequency" – 6:51
6. "Sometimes Words" – 4:38
7. "Yellow Turban" – 7:38
8. "Rumination" – 6:22
9. "Be a Fish" – 4:42
10. "Tapir Song" – 7:32
11. "RM" – 9:18

Vinyl edition

Disc one

1. "Limerick" – 10:21
2. "Sentence" – 5:08
3. "Tantric Porno" – 6:13
4. "Wank" – 5:28
5. "The High Frequency" – 6:51
6. "Sometimes Words" – 4:38
7. "Clean Sweep" – 3:53

Disc two

1. "Yellow Turban" – 7:38
2. "Rumination" – 6:22
3. "Be a Fish" – 4:42
4. "Tapir Song" – 7:32
5. "Brambles" – 3:41
6. "RM" – 9:18

== Personnel ==
Bardo Pond

- Isobel Sollenberger – lead vocals, flute
- Michael Gibbons – guitar, vocals
- John Gibbons – guitar, vocals
- Clint Takeda – bass
- Joe Culver – drums, vocals

Additional personnel

- Greg Calbi – mastering
- J. Cox – production, engineering
- David Frank – assistant engineer
