= This Is How You Smile =

Studio album by Helado Negro
- Released: March 8, 2019
- Studios: 411, Brooklyn, New York; Heard City, Manhattan, New York; CD Alley 2, Durham, North Carolina; Molly & Keith's House; Island Universe Space; AIR Serenbe, Atlanta, Georgia
- Length: 40:55
- Label: RVNG Intl.
- Producer: Helado Negro

Helado Negro chronology
Private Energy (2016)	This Is How You Smile (2019)	Far In (2021)

This Is How You Smile is the sixth studio album by American musician Helado Negro. It was released in March 2019 under RVNG Intl.

The title of the album is taken from a story by Jamaica Kincaid.

== Critical reception ==
Professional ratings
Aggregate scores
Source	Rating
AnyDecentMusic?	7.6/10
Metacritic	81/100
Review scores
Source	Rating
AllMusic	4.5/5 stars
Exclaim!	8/10
Loud and Quiet	7/10
Pitchfork	8.5/10
PopMatters	7/10
Spectrum Culture	4.5/5 stars
Tiny Mix Tapes	4/5
Uncut	7/10
Under the Radar	7.5/10

In a year-end essay for Slate, Ann Powers cited This Is How You Smile as proof that the album era format is not dead in 2019 but rather undergoing a "metamorphosis", with artists such as Negro utilizing the concept album through the culturally-relevant autobiographical narratives, which in this case is a "bilingual love letter to his family".

Pitchfork described the album as Lange's "sixth and best album as Helado Negro deepens and expands upon the imagistic nature of his lyrics and cosmic synth-folk. It is a sublime, masterful piece of music".

== Track listing ==
All tracks are written by Roberto Carlos Lange.

This Is How You Smile track listing
No.	Title	Length
1.	"Please Won't Please"	3:03
2.	"Imagining What to Do"	3:22
3.	"Echo for Camperdown Curio"	1:09
4.	"Fantasma Vaga"	4:23
5.	"Pais Nublado"	4:32
6.	"Running"	4:24
7.	"Seen My Aura"	4:08
8.	"Sabana de Luz"	3:16
9.	"November 7"	2:22
10.	"Todo Lo Que Me Falta"	4:35
11.	"Two Lucky"	3:53
12.	"My Name Is for My Friends"	1:38
Total length:		40:55

== Personnel ==
Credits adapted from liner notes and AllMusic.

- Roberto Carlos Lange – vocals, Casio MT-30, electric banjo, electronic percussion, classical guitar, electric guitar, Juno, Korg synthesizer, Moog synthesizer, noise, ondes, Roland Juno-6, vibraphone, field recording, recording, mixing, engineering
- Adron – vocals
- Raquel Berrios – vocals
- Luis del Valle – vocals
- Nene Humphrey – vocals
- Ela Minus – vocals
- Victoria Ruiz – vocals
- Xenia Rubinos – vocals
- Kristi Sword – echo, footsteps, whistle
- Matthew Crum – guitar, bass
- Keith Reynaud – guitar
- Owen Stewart-Robertson – guitar
- Jenn Wasner – guitar
- Sufjan Stevens – piano
- Bryan Abdul Collins – synthesizer
- Chris Devoe – synthesizer
- Oliver Hill – viola, violin
- Jason Trammell – drums
- Joe Westerlund – drums
- Jason Nazary – drums
- Jay Wynne – drums
- Tim Barnes – percussion
- Andy Stack – steel pan
- Jason Ajemian – bass
- Logan Coale – bass
- Nick Sanborn – synthesizer arrangements, writer
- Aquiles Navarro – trumpet
- Angela Morris – saxophone
- Nathaniel Morgan – saxophone
- Jean Cook – field recording
- Michael Kaufmann – field recording
- Isaac Lekach – field recording
- Matana Roberts – field recording
- Matt Werth – field recording
- Rachel Alina – mastering
- Anna Grothe-Shive – photography
- Will Work For Good – design
- Michelle Grinser – lacquer cut
