= Phasor (album) =

Studio album by Helado Negro
- Released: February 9, 2024
- Genre: Avant-pop
- Length: 35:02
- Label: 4AD
- Producer: Helado Negro

Helado Negro chronology
Far In (2021)	Phasor (2024)

Singles from Phasor
- 1. "LFO (Lupe Finds Oliveros)" Released: October 17, 2023; 2. "I Just Want to Wake Up with You" Released: November 14, 2023; 3. "Best for You and Me" Released: January 11, 2024

Phasor is the eighth studio album by American musician Helado Negro. It was released on February 9, 2024, through 4AD. It received acclaim from critics.

== Background and promotion ==
Inspiration for Phasor dates back as far as 2019, during a trip to University of Illinois Urbana-Champaign to learn about the complex synthesizer machine "Sal-Mar" developed by American composer Salvatore Martirano. The technology was engineered to create an infinite number of sound sequences, which stimulated Lange as to the "pursuit of constant curiosity in process and outcome". He referred to the songs he subsequently crafted as "the fruit" and the creation as the "unseen magical process" that he did not want everybody to see because "not everyone cares to see it". His intentions with the record were to "keep it not so heavily based on traumas or personal identities" but rather draw "inspiration from fiction". Other means of inspiration for the album include Lange's previous relocation to Asheville, North Carolina in order to be closer to his family, as well as the theme of food and the phrase "you are what you eat".

Phasor features nine tracks that Lange promoted through the release of the lead single "LFO" (abbreviation for "Lupe Finds Oliveros"), an "immersive experience that entrances and bewilders", performances at the Pitchfork Music Festival in London and Paris in 2023, as well as a world tour through Europe and North America in spring 2024.

== Critical reception ==
Professional ratings
Aggregate scores
Source	Rating
Metacritic	84/100
Review scores
Source	Rating
Beats Per Minute	82/100
Mojo	4/5 stars
The Observer	4/5 stars
Pitchfork	8.3/10
The Skinny	4/5 stars
Uncut	9/10

Phasor received a score of 84 out of 100 on review aggregator Metacritic based on nine critics' reviews, indicating "universal acclaim". Uncut felt that "while Phasor standouts such as 'Flores' evoke Os Mutantes in a narcoleptic fugue[, ...] on 'Colores Del Mar' and 'Out There', he strikes an equally deft balance between aqueous abstraction and buoyant, big-hearted avant-pop". Mojo stated that "rendered with a delicate, impressionistic touch, Phasor's dreamlike entreaties cut far deeper than predecessor Far In's lockdown ruminations". Tom Johnson of The Skinny called it an "endearingly tight collection" as well as a "rich and absorbing record that truly transports; placing the listener in a languid, half-lit morning where you're never quite asleep and never fully awake". John Amen of Beats Per Minute wrote, "With Phasor, Lange navigates an important rite of passage, testifying to life's glories and anticlimaxes. He's become an unflinching realist without sacrificing his curiosity, his capacity for wonder".

== Track listing ==
All tracks are written by Roberto Carlos Lange.

Phasor track listing
No.	Title	Length
1.	"LFO (Lupe Finds Oliveros)"	3:06
2.	"I Just Want to Wake Up with You"	3:50
3.	"Best for You and Me"	3:05
4.	"Colores Del Mar"	3:44
5.	"Echo Tricks Me"	4:09
6.	"Out There"	4:54
7.	"Flores"	3:19
8.	"Wish You Could Be Here"	3:53
9.	"Es Una Fantasia"	5:02
Total length:		35:02

== Personnel ==
Musicians

- Helado Negro – vocals, instrumentation
- Jason Nazary – drums, percussion (track 1)
- Jason Trammell – drums, percussion (tracks 2–4, 6, 9)
- Sufjan Stevens – vocals, tone bells (track 3)
- Opal Hoyt – piano, vocals (track 3)
- Benjamin Julia – drums, percussion (track 3)
- Zach Cooper – tempo consultation (track 3)
- Matt Crum – drums, percussion (tracks 4, 8)
- Savannah Harris – drums, percussion (track 4)
- Pinson Chanselle – drums, percussion (track 5)
- Rob Frye – drums, percussion(track 6)
- Jason Ajemian – bass (track 7)
- Andy Stack – bass (track 9)

Additional contributors

- Roberto Carlos Lange – production, mixing, engineering
- Rachel Alina – mastering
- Crystal Zapata – design
- Kristi Sword – drawing
- Sol Talamantes – inner sleeve photo
