= Well Oiled =

Well Oiled may refer to:

- Well Oiled (The Quireboys album)
- Well Oiled (Hash Jar Tempo album), 1997
- Well Oiled, an album by the UK band Engine
- Well Oiled (film), a 1947 Woody Woodpecker cartoon
