= Tragic Magic (Julianna Barwick and Mary Lattimore album) =

Studio album by Julianna Barwick and Mary Lattimore
- Released: January 16, 2026
- Recorded: 2025
- Studios: Philharmonie de Paris, Paris
- Genre: Ambient
- Length: 42:33
- Label: InFiné
- Producers: Julianna Barwick; Mary Lattimore

Julianna Barwick chronology
Healing Is a Miracle (2020)	Tragic Magic (2026)

Mary Lattimore chronology
Goodbye, Hotel Arkada (2023)	Tragic Magic (2026)

Tragic Magic is a collaborative studio album by American musicians Julianna Barwick and Mary Lattimore. It was released on January 16, 2026, through InFiné. It received universal acclaim from critics.

== Background ==
Julianna Barwick is an American composer, vocalist, and record producer. Mary Lattimore is an American harpist. Tragic Magic is their debut collaborative album. It is Barwick's first record since Healing Is a Miracle (2020) and Lattimore's first record since Goodbye, Hotel Arkada (2023). For the album, they were given access to the instrument collection of Philharmonie de Paris' Musée de la Musique. The album was written and recorded in nine days. It includes a cover version of Vangelis' "Rachel's Song" and a rendition of Roger Eno-written "Temple of the Winds". The album was released on January 16, 2026, through InFiné.

== Critical reception ==
Professional ratings
Aggregate scores
Source	Rating
Metacritic	83/100
Review scores
Source	Rating
AllMusic	4.5/5 stars
Beats Per Minute	80%
Exclaim!	7/10
The Guardian	4/5 stars
Mojo	4/5 stars
Pitchfork	7.4/10
The Skinny	4/5 stars
Sputnikmusic	4.6/5
Uncut	7/10
Under the Radar	7/10

According to the review aggregator Metacritic, Tragic Magic received "universal acclaim" based on a weighted average score of 83 out of 100 from 13 critic scores.

Safi Bugel of The Guardian described the album as "a wonderfully immersive set of new age and ambient tracks, where Barwick's airy, reverbed vocals and atmospheric synth washes interweave with, and accentuate, Lattimore's twinkling harp." Heather Phares of AllMusic wrote, "Simply put, Tragic Magic is an affecting, powerfully gentle testament to the alchemy that comes from sharing the burdens -- and opportunities -- of hard times with love and creativity." Richie Assaly of Exclaim! stated, "Though it may be categorized as experimental or avant-garde, Tragic Magic is an accessible and rewarding listen."

== Track listing ==
All tracks are written by Julianna Barwick and Mary Lattimore, except "Rachel's Song" by Vangelis and "Temple of the Winds" by Roger Eno.

Tragic Magic track listing
No.	Title	Length
1.	"Perpetual Adoration"	5:33
2.	"The Four Sleeping Princesses"	7:05
3.	"Rachel's Song"	4:15
4.	"Haze with No Haze"	7:12
5.	"Temple of the Winds"	2:37
6.	"Stardust"	7:11
7.	"Melted Moon"	8:37
Total length:		42:33

== Personnel ==
Credits adapted from liner notes.

- Julianna Barwick – arrangement, production, performance, synthesizer
- Mary Lattimore – arrangement, production, performance, harp
- Trevor Spencer – additional production, sound recording, mixing
- Heba Kadry – mastering
- Cat Solen – cover art, executive design
- David Normand – executive design

== Charts ==
Chart performance for Tragic Magic
Chart (2026)	Peak position
French Physical Albums (SNEP)	155
UK Album Downloads (Official Charts)	23
