= Tragic Magic =

Tragic Magic may refer to:

== Music ==
- Tragic Magic (Julianna Barwick and Mary Lattimore album), 2026
- Tragic Magic (Madder Rose album), 1997
- Tragic Magic (Matt Corby album), 2026

== Film and TV ==
- Tragic Magic (film)
