= Ticket Crystals =

Tickets Crystals

Studio album by Bardo Pond
- Released: June 6, 2006
- Recorded: 2005–2006
- Studio: The Lemur House, Philadelphia, PA
- Genre: Space rock; psychedelic rock; post-rock; shoegaze; freak folk; drone
- Length: 77:11
- Label: ATP Recordings
- Producer: Michael Gibbons, Bardo Pond

Bardo Pond chronology
On the Ellipse (2003)	Tickets Crystals (2006)	Bardo Pond (2010)

Professional ratings
Review scores
Source	Rating
AllMusic	4/5 stars
Gigwise	4/5 stars
Mondosonoro	1/10
Ox-Fanzine	7/10
Pitchfork Media	6.2/10
Popmatters	8/10
Stylus	B−

Ticket Crystals is the seventh studio album by Bardo Pond. It was released on June 6, 2006. The album features a cover of The Beatles' song "Cry Baby Cry".

== Reception ==
Like its predecessors, the album received largely positive reviews from critics. Fred Thomas of Allmusic found the "gentler" album to be "drenched in dubby reverb and delay, tucking its more menacing tones in layers of starlit musical wandering and resonating the most on subdued numbers like the sprawling "Isle" and a hazy reading of the Beatles' "Cry Baby Cry."" Jennifer Kelly of Popmatters considered the music to be "beautiful and [...] disturbing" in its combinations of "freak folk, drone and psychedelic metal." Gigwise hailed it as a "damn loud and a damn fine album", while Eric Hill of Exclaim! called it the band's best album since Lapsed.

More mixed reviews came from Cameron Macdonald of Stylus who found the band to be stylistically stagnating with the album, and criticized the closing track "Montana Sacra II" as being "[a] great opportunity squandered." In an otherwise positive review, Christian Maiwald of Ox-Fanzine found Sollenberger's vocals to be occasionally distracting & criticized the songs as being too short. Pitchfork's Mia Lily Clarke criticized the "overwhelming" use of flute & some of its "cloying prog mayhem."

A negative review came from Spanish magazine Mondosonoro, which scored the album a 1 out of 10.

== Track listing ==
All songs by Bardo Pond, except as noted.

=== CD track listing ===
1. "Destroying Angel" – 9:38
2. "Isle" – 11:13
3. "Lost Word" – 6:29
4. "Cry Baby Cry" (John Lennon, Paul McCartney) – 4:56
5. "FC II" – 18:16
6. "Moonshine" – 10:45
7. "Endurance" (lyrics by Gary Snyder)– 5:09
8. "Montana Sacra II" – 10:45

=== Vinyl track listing (2013 reissue) ===
Side A

1. "Destroying Angel" – 9:38
2. "Isle" – 11:13

Side B

1. "Lost Word" – 6:29
2. "Cry Baby Cry" (John Lennon, Paul McCartney) – 4:56
3. "Endurance" (lyrics by Gary Snyder)– 5:09

Side C

1. "FC II" – 18:16

Side D

1. "Moonshine" – 10:45
2. "Montana Sacra II" – 10:45

== Personnel ==
Bardo Pond

- Isobel Sollenberger – Vocals, Flute, Violin
- John Gibbons – Guitar, Synth, Percussion
- Michael Gibbons – Guitar, Producer, Engineer
- Clint Takeda – Bass
- Ed Farnsworth – Drums

Additional musicians

- Christina Madonia – Second Vocals on "Destroying Angel"
- Tom Greenwood – Guitar on "Lost Word"
