= Mary Lattimore =

American harpist

- Performing with Thurston Moore at Pitchfork Music Festival 2011.

Background information
- Born: September 11, 1980 (age 46); Asheville, North Carolina, U.S.
- Genre: Experimental
- Occupations: Composer; musician; harpist
- Instrument: Harp
- Years active: 2007–present
- Labels: Ghostly International; InFiné; Thrill Jockey; Three Lobed Recordings; Dead Oceans
- Formerly of: The Valerie Project
- Website: marylattimore.net

Mary Lattimore (born September 11, 1980) is an American classically trained harpist based in Los Angeles, California. In addition to her solo work and collaborations with fellow Philadelphia musician Jeff Zeigler, she has performed with indie musicians including Thurston Moore, Kurt Vile, and Steve Gunn.

== Biography ==
=== Early life ===
Originally from Asheville, North Carolina, Lattimore was raised in western North Carolina. Her mother was also a harpist, and so Mary learned to play the harp when she was 11 years old. She was not very interested in it at first, but this began to change as she got better at it. She studied at the Eastman School of Music, where she worked on the college radio. While taking summer classes at UNC, Lattimore also worked briefly at WXYC in Chapel Hill.

=== Musical career ===
One of Lattimore's first musical activities was her contribution to the Valerie Project, which released its self-titled debut album in 2007. This album was intended to be an alternative soundtrack to the film Valerie and Her Week of Wonders.

Lattimore released her first solo effort in 2012, a self-titled cassette, on Fred Thomas' Life Like imprint. The following year, this album was re-released by Desire Path Recordings as The Withdrawing Room.

In 2014, Lattimore and Zeigler released Slant of Light on Thrill Jockey.

Also that year, Lattimore received a Pew Fellowship grant, which she used to travel around California and Texas; while doing so, she recorded the album At the Dam, which was released on Ghostly International in 2016. The album's title was taken from an essay about the Hoover Dam in Joan Didion's 1979 book The White Album.

In 2018, Lattimore released the album Hundreds of Days, which received critical acclaim. In that year, she also released Ghost Forests, a collaborative album with Meg Baird. In 2019, she released New Rain Duets, a collaborative album with Mac McCaughan.

In 2020, Lattimore released a solo album, Silver Ladders. In 2022, she released a cover version of Bill Fay's "Love Is the Tune" as a single through Dead Oceans. In 2023, she released another solo album, Goodbye, Hotel Arkada.

In 2026, Lattimore released a collaborative album with Julianna Barwick, titled Tragic Magic, through InFiné.

== Discography ==
=== Studio albums ===
- The Withdrawing Room (Desire Path, 2013)
- Slant of Light (with Jeff Zeigler; Thrill Jockey, 2014)
- At the Dam (Ghostly International, 2016)
- Hundreds of Days (Ghostly International, 2018)
- Ghost Forests (with Meg Baird; Three Lobed Recordings, 2018)
- New Rain Duets (with Mac McCaughan; Three Lobed Recordings, 2019)
- Silver Ladders (Ghostly International, 2020)
- Goodbye, Hotel Arkada (Ghostly International, 2023)
- Tragic Magic (with Julianna Barwick; InFiné, 2026)

=== Compilation albums ===
- Luciferin Light (Kit, 2015)
- Collected Pieces (Ghostly International, 2017)
- Collected Pieces II (Ghostly International, 2021)

=== Singles ===
- "Love Is the Tune" (Dead Oceans, 2022)

=== Guest appearances ===
- Julianna Barwick – Healing Is a Miracle ("Oh, Memory"; Ninja Tune, 2020)
- Steve Gunn – Other You ("Sugar Kiss"; Matador Records, 2021)
- Lonnie Holley – Tonky ("Life"; Jagjaguwar, 2025)
