= And Now the Rain Sounds Like Life Is Falling Down Through It =

Studio album by Roy Montgomery
- Released: 13 April 1998
- Recorded: 26 December 1997 – 12 January 1998
- Studio: Nightshift Studios (Christchurch, NZ)
- Genre: Psychedelic rock, post-rock
- Length: 53:51
- Label: Drunken Fish

Roy Montgomery chronology
Temple IV (1996)	And Now the Rain Sounds Like Life Is Falling Down Through It (1998)	True (1999)

Professional ratings
Review scores
Source	Rating
AllMusic	4/5 stars

And Now the Rain Sounds Like Life Is Falling Down Through It is the third studio album by guitarist and composer Roy Montgomery, released on 13 April 1998 by Drunken Fish Records.

== Track listing ==
All tracks are written by Roy Montgomery

No.	Title	Length
1.	"No She Never Made It to Japan"	1:01
2.	"In Our Own Time"	5:35
3.	"The Opportunity Passed in Less Than a Minute"	0:59
4.	"Down from That Hill and up to the Pond"	6:31
5.	"And Now the Rain Sounds Like Life Is Falling Down Through It"	1:31
6.	"Kafka Was Correct"	5:22
7.	"Catherine at Aldeburgh"	3:24
8.	"Entertaining Mr. Jones"	4:57
9.	"The Small Sleeper"	2:58
10.	"Algeria?"	5:07
11.	"A Little Soundtrack"	2:46
12.	"Ill at Home"	11:15
13.	"In Another Time"	2:25

== Personnel ==
Adapted from the And Now the Rain Sounds Like Life Is Falling Down Through It liner notes.

- Roy Montgomery – guitar, EBow, mixing
- Robert Meissner – piano
- Jessica Meyer – illustrations

== Release history ==
Region	Date	Label	Format	Catalog
United States	1998	Drunken Fish	CD	DFR-41
