= On the Ellipse =

Studio album by Bardo Pond
- Released: July 8, 2003
- Recorded: October 2002 – January 2003
- Studio: The Lemur House, Philadelphia, PA
- Genre: Space rock; psychedelic rock; post-rock; stoner rock; shoegaze
- Length: 53:07
- Label: ATP Recordings
- Producer: Bardo Pond, Michael Gibbons

Bardo Pond chronology
| Dilate (2001) | On the Ellipse (2003) | Ticket Crystals (2006) |

Professional ratings
Review scores
| Source | Rating |
|---|---|
| AllMusic | 4/5 stars |
| Pitchfork Media | 7.2/10 |
| Record Collector | 5/5 stars |
| Uncut | 3/5 stars |

On the Ellipse is the sixth album by Bardo Pond and first for ATP Recordings. It was released on July 8, 2003.

== Reception ==
=== Initial ===
Heather Phares of Allmusic called the album "[a]nother triumph" for the band, on which "they continue to top themselves even if they're no longer among the most fashionable vanguard of underground rock." She went on to describe it as a more accessible and "much moodier" work, and hailed the track "JD" as "an instant career highlight. Beginning with a relentless drone that switches between harsh and beautiful as it unfurls, the song lures the listener with five minutes of gentle acoustic guitars and Sollenberger's dreamy, brooding singing before unleashing a quintessentially Bardo Pond onslaught of distortion and drums." Both Brainwashed and Comes with a Smile called it the band's best effort, with the latter's reviewer Ian Fletcher writing: "Nowhere is feedback more melancholic, more emotive, than that fashioned by Bardo Pond. And their misty depths have never been more tempting than here and now."

A more mixed reception came from Pitchfork, which published a joke review written by staff member Andrew Bryant in lieu of a proper one. Uncut gave the album 3-stars out of 5, writing that while the band did improve with age, they were "[s]triving a little hard for cosmic resonance, perhaps".

=== Retrospective ===
In a retrospective review published in 2020, JR Moores of Record Collector gave the album a perfect score, calling the comparatively "lusher and mellower" album "breathtakingly beautiful" and even "life-changing".

== Track listing ==
1. "J.D." – 7:24
2. "Every Man" – 8:59
3. "Dom's Lament" – 6:45
4. "Test" – 9:51
5. "Walking Clouds" – 7:12
6. "Night of Frogs" – 12:56

== Personnel ==
- Isobel Sollenberger – Vocals, Flute, Violin
- Michael Gibbons – Guitar, Producer
- John Gibbons – Guitar, Synthesizer, Percussion
- Clint Takeda – Bass
- Ed Farnsworth – Drums
