= The Magic Place =

Studio album by Julianna Barwick
- Released: February 21, 2011
- Recorded: 2010–2011
- Genre: Ambient; new-age
- Length: 43:44
- Label: Asthmatic Kitty
- Producer: Paul Gold; Julianna Barwick

Julianna Barwick chronology
The Magic Place (2011)	Nepenthe (2013)

The Magic Place is the debut studio album by ambient artist Julianna Barwick. The album was released on February 21, 2011, by Asthmatic Kitty Records. It peaked at number 4 on the Billboard New Age Albums chart.

== Background ==
Barwick started working on her album in mid-2010 and in early 2011 the album was released by Asthmatic Kitty Records. The album contains elements of new-age and ambient music. Upon completion of the album, Barwick said:

"The Magic Place was a tree on our farm. It was in the back pasture. It was one tree that grew up, down and around. You had to crawl in and once you were inside, it was like there were different rooms, and you could actually lay in the branches. We named it 'The Magic Place' because it really was magical—especially for a kid... and that's how I feel about my life right now—without trying to sound too hippy dippy or cosmic, this year has definitely been a magical one."

== Critical reception ==
Professional ratings
Aggregate scores
Source	Rating
AnyDecentMusic?	7.8/10
Metacritic	82/100
Review scores
Source	Rating
AllMusic	4/5 stars
Drowned in Sound	8/10
Fact	4/5
The Irish Times	4/5 stars
Mojo	4/5 stars
MusicOMH	4.5/5 stars
Pitchfork	8.5/10
PopMatters	8/10
Slant Magazine	3/5 stars
Uncut	4/5 stars

The Magic Place received enthusiastic reviews from music critics. At Metacritic, which assigns a normalized rating out of 100 to reviews from mainstream critics, the album received an average score of 82, based on 18 reviews, indicating "universal acclaim". Luke Winkie of MusicOMH found that Barwick "is crafting gorgeously effecting sounds in a way that nobody has quite heard before, far beyond the snickering Enya comparisons or the reductive ties to Brian Eno's ambience... this isn't music for thinking or studying, this is just music for living". AllMusic writer K. Ross Hoffman wrote that "her sound has a comfortingly homespun, unfussy quality, and a patient, uplifting serenity, that remain uniquely her own". Mark Richardson of Pitchfork awarded the album the site's "Best New Music" designation and felt that it "stands above her earlier work in virtually every way". Mojo praised it as "her most fully involved album, suffused with the warmth of fond memories and a deep, dream-like resonance", while Uncut wrote: "The sense of naive wonder evident recalls the bewitching power of Sigur Rós."

Arnold Pan of PopMatters wrote, "Try as you might to explain Julianna Barwick's incomparable, indescribable music, maybe it's best to let The Magic Place do all the talking, because the results speak for themselves". BBC Music was positive on the album and wrote: "The Magic Place, splendidly, isolates the listener, cuts them off from the world around them". In a mixed assessment, Slant Magazine's Kevin Liedel instead found the album to be "a beautiful, ambiguous diversion better suited as a companion soundtrack to some experimental film or art installation than as the debut for a promising young singer".

Pitchfork placed the album at number 24 on its list of the top 50 albums of 2011. BBC Music ranked it at 19 of 25 in its own run down of the best albums of 2011.

In 2016, Pitchfork placed the album at number 30 on its list of the 50 best ambient albums of all time.

== Track listing ==
No.	Title	Length
1.	"Envelop"	5:40
2.	"Keep Up the Good Work"	4:48
3.	"The Magic Place"	3:51
4.	"Cloak"	4:05
5.	"White Flag"	4:53
6.	"Vow"	4:39
7.	"Bob in Your Gait"	4:03
8.	"Prizewinning"	6:43
9.	"Flown"	5:04
Total length:		43:44

== Charts ==
Chart performance for The Magic Place
Chart (2011)	Peak position
US New Age Albums (Billboard)	4
