= Bardo Pond (album) =

Studio album by Bardo Pond
- Released: December 6, 2010
- Recorded: 2009
- Studio: The Lemur House, Philadelphia, PA
- Genre: Space rock, psychedelic rock
- Length: 70:54 (CD/digital); 79:17 (vinyl)
- Label: Fire Records (UK) - FIRE LP 157

Bardo Pond chronology
Ticket Crystals (2006)	Bardo Pond (2010)

Professional ratings
Aggregate scores
Source	Rating
AnyDecentMusic?	7.1/10
Metacritic	71/100
Review scores
Source	Rating
AllMusic	3.5/5 stars
The A.V. Club	B
Clash	8/10
DIY	3.5/5 stars
Mondosonoro	5/10
OndaRock	4.5/10
Pitchfork	6.5/10
Q	3/5 stars
Tiny Mix Tapes	3.5/5 stars

Bardo Pond is the 8th studio album by Bardo Pond, released in 2010.

== Track listing ==
All songs written by Bardo Pond; "Just Once" lyrics inspired by Sam Shepard.

=== CD track listing ===
1. "Just Once" – 7:19
2. "Don't Know About You" – 4:27
3. "Sleeping" – 8:38
4. "Undone" – 21:02
5. "Cracker Wrist" – 9:00
6. "Await the Star" (titled "The Stars Behind" on digital release) – 12:59
7. "Wayne's Tune" – 7:27 (edited for CD/digital releases)

=== Vinyl track listing ===
Side A

1. "Just Once" – 7:19
2. "Don't Know About You" – 4:27
3. "Sleeping" – 8:38

Side B

1. "Undone" – 21:02

Side C

1. "Cracker Wrist" – 9:00
2. Await the Star" – 12:59

Side D

1. "Wayne's Tune" – 15:52 (full-length version on vinyl)

== Personnel ==
Bardo Pond

- Isobel Sollenberger – Vocals, Flute
- John Gibbons – Guitars
- Michael Gibbons – Guitars, Engineer, Cover Art
- Aaron Igler – Synthesizer, Electronics
- Clint Takeda – Bass, Cover Art
- Jason Kourkounis – Drums

Additional personnel

- Dan Baltzer – Harmonica on "Just Once"
- Jeremiah Misfeldt – Farfisa Organ on "Sleeping" and "Cracker Wrist"
