= Music from the Film Hey Badfinger =

Studio album by Roy Montgomery
- Released: 24 December 2012
- Recorded: 2012
- Genre: Space rock
- Length: 46:46
- Label: Yellow Electric

Roy Montgomery chronology
| Inroads: New and Collected Works (2007) | Music from the Film Hey Badfinger (2012) |

Professional ratings
Review scores
| Source | Rating |
|---|---|
| Pitchfork Media | (6.2/10) |

Music from the Film Hey Badfinger is the sixth album by guitarist and composer Roy Montgomery, released on 24 December 2012 through Yellow Electric.

== Track listing ==
All music is composed by Roy Montgomery

Side one
| No. | Title | Length |
|---|---|---|
| 1. | "Go Easy Pete Ham" |
| 2. | "You Too Tom Evans" |
| 3. | "No Matter Why" |
| 4. | "Slowly Picking Up" |
| 5. | "Go and Get It" |
| 6. | "A Chorus of Comsats" |
| 7. | "Kuepper's Lullaby" |
| 8. | "Meet You at Gallery Floyd" |
| 9. | "We Slept Here Briefly" |
| 10. | "Why Try to Run?" |
| 11. | "Slowly Picking Up Again" |
| 12. | "Can't Leave the House Now" |

Side two
| No. | Title | Length |
|---|---|---|
| 1. | "Child on a Swing" |
| 2. | "On Entering a Great Hall" |
| 3. | "Half-Dead Revolving Speaker" |
| 4. | "Eau de Velvet" |
| 5. | "Zabriskie Point Revisited" |
| 6. | "The Immortal Pleasure of Wanda Lust" |
| 7. | "Goes Straight Through My Head" |
| 8. | "Still Can't Leave the House" |
| 9. | "Der Schrieckenbacker" |
| 10. | "Kuepper's Alibi" |
| 11. | "Also sprach Badfinger" |

== Personnel ==
- Roy Montgomery – guitar
