= 324 E. 13th Street 7 =

324 E. 13th Street No. 7

Compilation album by Roy Montgomery
- Released: 16 November 1999
- Recorded: 1985 – February 1995
- Genre: Neo-psychedelia
- Length: 71:19
- Label: Drunken Fish

Roy Montgomery chronology
True (1999)	324 E. 13th Street No. 7 (1999)	The Allegory of Hearing (2000)

Professional ratings
Review scores
Source	Rating
Allmusic	2.5/5 stars
Alternative Press	3/5 stars
Pitchfork Media	(7.8/10)

324 E. 13th Street #7 is a compilation by composer and guitarist Roy Montgomery, released on 16 November 1999 through Drunken Fish Records.

== Track listing ==
All tracks are written by Roy Montgomery, except where noted

No.	Title	Writer(s)	Length
1.	"Suzanne Said"	The Shallows	4:49
2.	"Trial by Separation"	The Shallows	4:33
3.	"Submerged & Colourful"		3:03
4.	"Cousin Song"		2:26
5.	"Film as a Subversive Art"		2:49
6.	"Long Night"		3:31
7.	"It's Cold Outside"	Stephen Cogle, Peter Stapleton	3:04
8.	"German Sister"	Roy Montgomery, Kim Pieters	3:54
9.	"Something Else Again"		2:37
10.	"Adrift"		3:21
11.	"Just Melancholy"		4:00
12.	"Used To"	Bruce Gilbert, Graham Lewis	3:05
13.	"Times Three"		2:21
14.	"Some Other Time"		3:39
15.	"Strange Attractor"		3:02
16.	"On The Road I"		4:03
17.	"E.N.D."		3:05
18.	"Intertidal"		4:45
19.	"Fine, Fine, Fine"		3:48
20.	"In Your Wake"		5:24

== Personnel ==
Adapted from the 324 E. 13th Street #7 liner notes.

- Jessica Meyer – illustrations, design
- Roy Montgomery – vocals, guitar, keyboards, mixing, photography

== Release history ==
Region	Date	Label	Format	Catalog
United States	1999	Drunken Fish	CD	DFR-28
United States	2014	Yellow Electric	LP	GR-013
