= Bardo Pond =

American psychedelic rock band

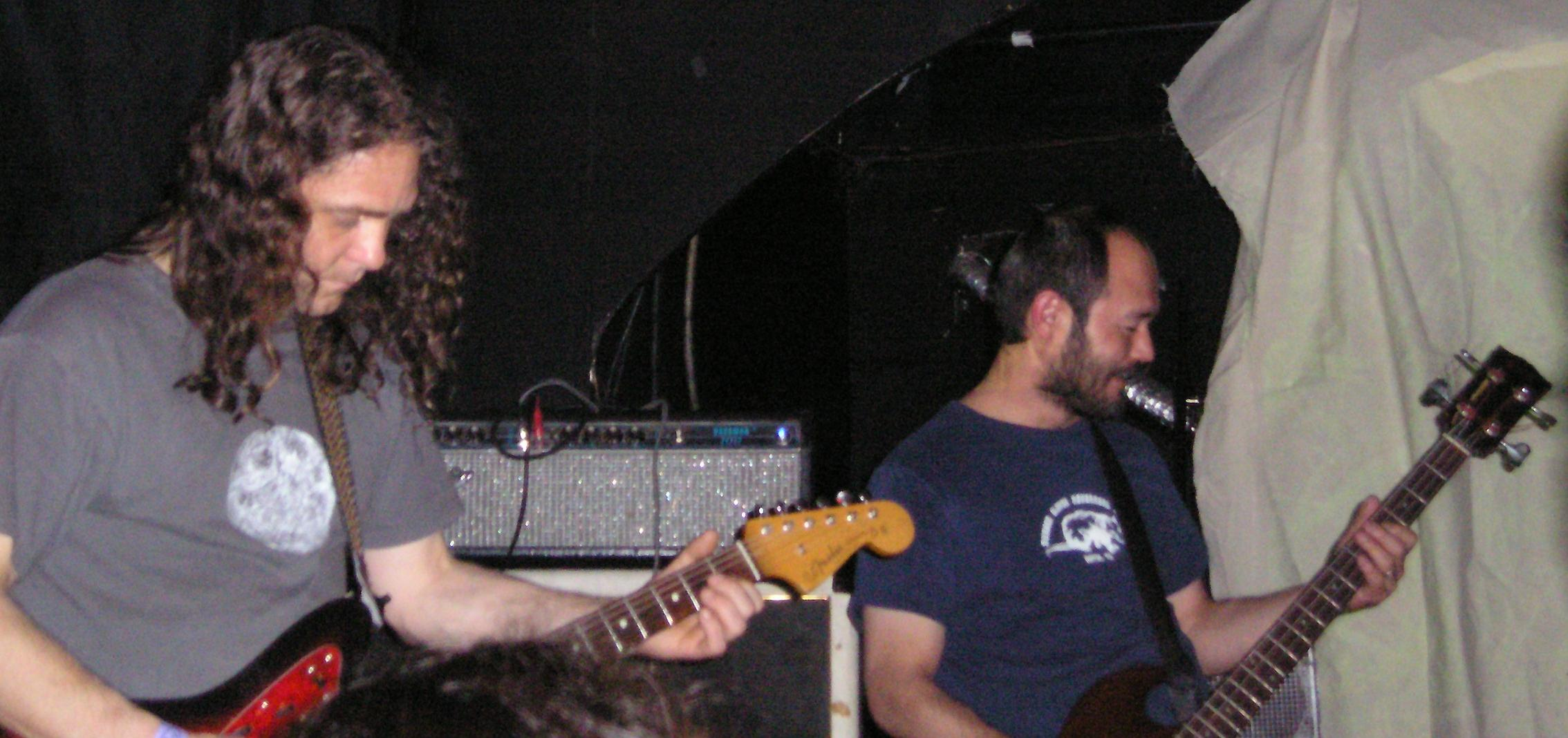
- Bardo Pond in 2006

Background information
- Origin: Philadelphia, Pennsylvania, U.S.
- Genres: Space rock, neo-psychedelia, shoegaze, post-rock, drone, noise rock
- Years active: 1991–present
- Labels: Drunken Fish, Fire, ATP, Important, Matador, Three Lobed
- Members: John Gibbons; Michael Gibbons; Isobel Sollenberger; Clint Takeda; Jason Kourkounis
- Past members: Joe Culver; Ed Farnsworth; Aaron Igler
- Website: bardopond.org

Bardo Pond is an American psychedelic rock band formed in 1991. It consists of Michael Gibbons (guitar), John Gibbons (guitar), Isobel Sollenberger (flute and vocals), Clint Takeda (bass guitar) and Jason Kourkounis (drums). Bardo Pond's music is often classified as space rock, acid rock, post-rock, shoegazing, noise or psychedelic rock. Some Bardo Pond album titles have been derived from the names of esoteric psychedelic substances. Their sound has been likened to Pink Floyd, Spacemen 3 and My Bloody Valentine amongst others.

Allmusic describes Bardo Pond as having "lengthy, deliberate sound explorations filled with all the hallmarks of modern-day space rock: droning guitars, thick distortion, feedback, reverb, and washes of white noise." Bardo Pond are a taper-friendly band who encourage fans to make recordings of their shows.

== Early years ==
According to guitarist Michael Gibbons, the band members came together post-university: "...we were basically just out of college, actually, and we just got really interested in free music, and that's where it started. And we were artists too [a number of the band are visual artists]. So were just started playing free improvised sounds – it was really just kind of that love of making noise and sounds that got us together. Basically we didn't really learn how to play songs until after about four years, and that's when things started clicking, and we actually made up songs. But it's still the same thing". Joining with guitarist Clint Takeda, they began jamming, and Takeda gave the trio the name Bardo Pond, from the Tibetan Book of the Dead. At the same time, school chums Sollenberger and Sentz joined the group. The group released the first of several self-distributed cassettes, Shone Like a Ton, in 1992, before releasing Bufo Alvarius on Drunken Fish Records in 1995. Their next record, 1996's Amanita, marked the band's transition to Matador Records and international distribution.

== Side projects ==
The members of Bardo Pond also operate a number of side projects.

- 500 mg is Michael Gibbons' solo project.
- Alasehir is a psychedelic/stoner rock trio featuring Michael Gibbons, John Gibbons and Jason Kourkounis.
- Alumbrados produces psychedelic folk/drone music and consists of Michael Gibbons, John Gibbons, Michael Zanghi and Aaron Igler.
- Prairie Dog Flesh is more improvisational and rearranges the members of Bardo Pond with Takeda on vocals.
- Hash Jar Tempo is a collaboration between Bardo Pond and Roy Montgomery. A pun on Ash Ra Tempel, this project resulted from two "marathon jam/recording sessions" between the two parties and produced two albums: Well Oiled (released in 1997, recorded in 1995) and Under Glass (released in 1999, recorded in 1998).
- LSD Pond is a collaboration between Bardo Pond and Japanese psychedelic rock band LSD March. A self-titled album was released in 2008 and contains two discs with live recordings of two nights of jamming.
- Moon Phantoms is a collaboration between Bardo Pond and Japanese psychedelic rock band Suishou No Fune. Their self-titled album was released in 2009.
- Third Troll features Michael and John Gibbons (guitars), Sollenberger (flute), and includes Kevin Moist (saxophone) and Aaron Igler (synths).
- Baikal conducts free form psych experiments. The band consists of John Gibbons, Michael Gibbons, Clint Takeda and Jason Kourkonis. They have released a self-titled album on Important Records.
- Vapour Theories is a duo of Michael and John Gibbons. They have released three albums: 'Decant' (self-released), 'Joint Chiefs' (The Lotus Sound), and 'Celestial Scuzz' (Fire Records).
- Jason Kourkounis participated as drummer 72 in the Boredoms' 77 Boadrum performance which occurred on July 7, 2007, at the Empire-Fulton Ferry State Park in Brooklyn, New York. He is also currently in Hot Snakes and The Night Marchers, and previously played drums for The Delta 72, The Burning Brides, and Mule.

== Discography ==
=== Studio albums ===
- Shone Like a Ton (1992)
- No Hashish, No Change Money, No Sake Sake (1993)
- Bufo Alvarius (1995)
- Amanita (1996)
- Lapsed (1997)
- Set and Setting (1999)
- Vol. 1 (2000)
- Dilate (2001)
- Vol. II (2001)
- Vol. 3 (2002)
- Vol. IV (2002)
- Tigris/Euphrates split 12" with Subarachnoid Space (2002)
- On the Ellipse (2003)
- 4/23/03 with Tom Carter (2004)
- Vol. 5 (2004)
- Vol. 6 (2005)
- Ticket Crystals (2006)
- Batholith (2008)
- Circuit VIII (2008)
- Vol. 7 (2009)
- Peri (2009)
- Gazing at Shilla (2009)
- Bardo Pond (2010)
- Yntra (2012)
- Peace On Venus (2013)
- Parallelogram with Yo La Tengo (2015)
- Acid Guru Pond with Acid Mothers Temple and Guru Guru (2016)
- Under the Pines (2017)
- Vol. 8 (2018)
- Peel Sessions (2023)
- Vol. 9 (2024)

=== EPs ===
- Big Laughing Jym (1995)
- Slab (2000)
- Purposeful Availment (2002)
- Bog split with Buck Paco (2005)
- Adrop (2006)
- Keep Mother – Volume 5 split with PRE (2007)
- Split with Carlton Melton (2011)
- Rise Above It All (2013)
- Looking For Another Place (2014)
- Is There a Heaven? (2015)

=== Compilations ===
- Cypher Documents I (2004)
- Selections: Volumes I-IV 2005)
- Refulgo (2014)
- Melt Away (2024)
