= Will (Julianna Barwick album) =

Studio album by Julianna Barwick
- Released: May 6, 2016
- Genres: Ambient; experimental
- Length: 38:34
- Label: Dead Oceans
- Producer: Julianna Barwick

Julianna Barwick chronology
Nepenthe (2013)	Will (2016)	Healing Is a Miracle (2020)

Will is the third studio album from American singer-songwriter Julianna Barwick. It was released in May 2016, under Dead Oceans Records.

== Critical reception ==
Professional ratings
Aggregate scores
Source	Rating
Metacritic	77/100
Review scores
Source	Rating
AllMusic	4/5 stars
Drowned in Sound	8/10
Pitchfork	8.2/10

According to the review aggregator Metacritic, Will received "generally favorable reviews" based on a weighted average score of 77 out of 100 from 22 critic scores.

=== Accolades ===
Publication	Accolade	Year	Rank
The Quietus	Albums of the Year 2016	2016	34
The Skinny	Top 50 Albums of 2016	2016	32

== Track listing ==
No.	Title	Length
1.	"St. Apolonia"	2:13
2.	"Nebula"	5:34
3.	"Beached"	4:08
4.	"Same"	4:55
5.	"Wist"	2:40
6.	"Big Hollow"	5:30
7.	"Heading Home"	3:57
8.	"Someway"	4:30
9.	"See, Know"	5:04
Total length:		38:34

== Charts ==
Chart performance for Will
Chart (2016)	Peak position
UK Independent Albums (OCC)	42
US Heatseekers Albums (Billboard)	21
US New Age Albums (Billboard)	3
