= Inroads: New and Collected Works =

Compilation album by Roy Montgomery
- Released: 13 February 2007
- Genre: Neo-psychedelia
- Length: 127:07
- Label: Rebis

Roy Montgomery chronology
| Silver Wheel of Prayer (2001) | Inroads: New and Collected Works (2007) | Music from the Film Hey Badfinger (2012) |

Inroads: New and Collected Works is a compilation album by Roy Montgomery, released on 13 February 2007 through Rebis Recordings. It couples seventeen previously released compositions with five newly recorded ones.

== Track listing ==
All music is composed by Roy Montgomery

Disc one
| No. | Title | Length |
|---|---|---|
| 1. | "Dawn Fades Over Ocean" | 5:38 |
| 2. | "Liverpool 1982" | 3:38 |
| 3. | "Sterling Morrison Corner 10th and First 1966" | 4:24 |
| 4. | "For Kerry" | 2:19 |
| 5. | "A Précis of the 60s" | 7:45 |
| 6. | "On the Road 2" | 3:33 |
| 7. | "A Flock of Fish" | 4:57 |
| 8. | "Goodbye Mrs D'Eath" | 6:15 |
| 9. | "Cumulus and Fugue" | 5:10 |
| 10. | "London Is Swinging by His Neck" (instrumental version) | 10:39 |
| 11. | "Temple VI" (slight return) | 3:17 |

Disc two
| No. | Title | Length |
|---|---|---|
| 1. | "Two Trajectory" | 7:21 |
| 2. | "One Trajectory" | 5:18 |
| 3. | "Zabriskie Point" (part one) | 4:34 |
| 4. | "Lazy Boy (Treatment)" | 4:21 |
| 5. | "Zabriskie Point" (part two) | 5:41 |
| 6. | "Particle" | 5:12 |
| 7. | "Sister Clean" | 6:30 |
| 8. | "Last Days of Mankind" | 6:45 |
| 9. | "Wave" | 6:59 |
| 10. | "Gang of Four vs Peter Frampton" | 20:14 |
| 11. | "2LB" | 12:28 |

== Personnel ==
- Arnold Van Bussell – remastering
- Roy Montgomery – guitar, remastering, photography
