= Believe You Me (Ombre album) =

Studio album by Ombre
- Released: August 21, 2012
- Recorded: 2012
- Studio: Island Universe Space (Brooklyn, New York)
- Length: 36:19
- Label: Asthmatic Kitty

Believe You Me is the debut studio album by Ombre, an American music duo of Julianna Barwick and Helado Negro. It was released on August 21, 2012, through Asthmatic Kitty. It received generally favorable reviews from critics.

== Background ==
Ombre consists of Julianna Barwick and Helado Negro. Believe You Me is the duo's debut record. Unlike her previous work, Barwick plays guitar, vibraphone, electric piano, and synthesizer on the album. A music video was released for the track "Cara Falsa".

== Critical reception ==
Professional ratings
Aggregate scores
| Source | Rating |
|---|---|
| Metacritic | 75/100 |
Review scores
| Source | Rating |
| AllMusic | 3.5/5 stars |
| Consequence | 3.5/5 stars |
| Drowned in Sound | 8/10 |
| The Line of Best Fit | 6/10 |
| Pitchfork | 7.1/10 |
| PopMatters | 8/10 |

According to the review aggregator Metacritic, Believe You Me received "generally favorable reviews" based on a weighted average score of 75 out of 100 from 10 critic scores.

Mike Diver of BBC commented that "Negro's psychedelic leanings are balanced by Barwick's more spectral, somewhat sacred stylings, the results never feeling forced." Philip Majorins of PopMatters stated, "A rich wall of ambience is invoked and sustained over the course of ten tracks that last just over 35 minutes." K. Ross Hoffman of AllMusic called the album "loose, exploratory, warmly generous and open-minded, eager to share and learn, but still with a slight sense of polite restraint." Adam Kivel of Consequence stated, "Dream pop may be a genre du jour, but few produce material quite so dreamy as Believe You Me."

== Track listing ==
All tracks are written by Julianna Barwick and Helado Negro.

Believe You Me track listing
| No. | Title | Length |
|---|---|---|
| 1. | "Noche Brilla" | 2:30 |
| 2. | "Weight Those Words" | 3:22 |
| 3. | "Vistate" | 5:20 |
| 4. | "Dawning" | 5:01 |
| 5. | "Sense" | 3:54 |
| 6. | "Tormentas" | 5:04 |
| 7. | "Cara Falsa" | 3:35 |
| 8. | "The Nod" | 4:06 |
| 9. | "Pausa Primera" | 1:28 |
| 10. | "Noche Brilla Pt. 2" | 1:57 |
| Total length: | | 36:19 |

== Personnel ==
Credits adapted from liner notes.

- Julianna Barwick – music
- Helado Negro – music
- Jason Ajemian – double bass
- Shelly Burgon – harp
- Jamie Reeder – violin
- Matt Bauder – saxophone
- Jacob Wick – trumpet
- Shannon Fields – clarinet, Omnichord, Casio keyboard
- Ahmed Gallab – Mellotron, Moog synthesizer
- Jason Trammell – electronics, percussion
- Matt Crum – drums, percussion
- Mario Schambon – percussion
- Roberto Carlos Lange – recording, mixing
- Nori Tanaka – engineering (1)
- Paul Coors – sleeve
- Joe Lamb – cover photography
- Carlos A. Lange – towel photography
- Jonathan Dueck – other photography
