= Pitchfork Music Festival 2011 =

Music festival

- Dates: July 15–17, 2011
- Locations: Union Park, Chicago, United States
- Website: pitchforkmusicfestival.com

The Pitchfork Music Festival 2011 was held on July 15 to 17, 2011 at the Union Park, Chicago, United States. The festival was headlined by Animal Collective, Fleet Foxes and TV on the Radio.

== Lineup ==
Headline performers are listed in boldface. Artists listed from latest to earliest set times.

Green
| Friday, July 15 | Saturday, July 16 | Sunday, July 17 |
|---|---|---|
| **Animal Collective**; Guided by Voices; Battles | **Fleet Foxes**; The Dismemberment Plan; No Age; Cold Cave; Julianna Barwick | **TV on the Radio**; Deerhunter; Ariel Pink's Haunted Graffiti; Kurt Vile & the Violators; The Fresh & Onlys |

Red
| Friday, July 15 | Saturday, July 16 | Sunday, July 17 |
|---|---|---|
| Neko Case; Thurston Moore; EMA | DJ Shadow; Destroyer; Gang Gang Dance; Woods | Cut Copy; Superchunk; Odd Future Wolf Gang Kill Them All; Yuck |

Blue
| Friday, July 15 | Saturday, July 16 | Sunday, July 17 |
|---|---|---|
| James Blake; Das Racist; Curren$y tUnE-yArDs; Gatekeeper | Zola Jesus; Twin Shadow; The Radio Dept. OFF! Wild Nothing; G-Side; Sun Airway; Chrissy Murderbot feat. MC Zulu | HEALTH; Toro y Moi; Kylesa; Baths; Shabazz Palaces; Twin Sister; How to Dress Well; Darkstar |
