= True (Roy Montgomery and Chris Heaphy album) =

Studio album by Roy Montgomery/Chris Heaphy
- Released: 6 April 1999
- Recorded: August – October 1996
- Studio: Nightshift Studios (Christchurch, NZ)
- Genre: Post-rock
- Length: 50:40
- Label: Kranky

Roy Montgomery chronology
And Now the Rain Sounds Like Life Is Falling Down Through It (1998)	True (1999)	324 E. 13th Street #7 (1999)

Professional ratings
Review scores
Source	Rating
Allmusic	4/5 stars
Pitchfork Media	(5.2/10)

True is an album by guitarists Roy Montgomery and Chris Heaphy, released on 6 April 1999 through Kranky.

== Track listing ==
All tracks are written by Roy Montgomery

No.	Title	Length
1.	"Virtually So #1"	5:31
2.	"Virtually So #2"	9:16
3.	"Unfathomable #1"	5:54
4.	"Picnic Time"	3:58
5.	"Clouding Over"	7:07
6.	"Certainly"	2:46
7.	"Spurious"	5:31
8.	"Unfathomable #2"	10:37

== Personnel ==
Adapted from the True liner notes.

Musicians

- Chris Heaphy – electric guitar
- Roy Montgomery – electric guitar, organ, electronics, recording

Production and additional personnel

- Arnie Van Bussel – engineering

== Release history ==
Region	Date	Label	Format	Catalog
United States	1999	Kranky	CD	KRANK 033
