= Set and Setting (album) =

Studio album by Bardo Pond
- Released: August 10, 1999
- Studio: Lemur House, Philadelphia, PA
- Genre: Space rock; psychedelic rock; stoner rock; noise rock; shoegaze; drone
- Length: 49:08
- Label: Matador Records
- Producer: Bardo Pond, Michael Gibbons

Bardo Pond chronology
Lapsed (1997)	Set and Setting (1999)	Dilate (2001)

Professional ratings
Review scores
Source	Rating
Allmusic	3/5 stars
The Boston Phoenix	3/4 stars
NME	4/5 stars

Set and Setting is the fourth album by the American psychedelic rock group Bardo Pond. It was released on August 10, 1999 on Matador Records. The album's title comes from the writings of Timothy Leary.

== Reception ==
The critical reception to Set and Setting was quite positive. Head Heritage praised the album, describing it as a combination of "Sabbath, Sonic Youth, My Bloody Valentine and smoking a bag of something interesting." "While their last two records have been more concerned with sonic crunch than actual songwriting," wrote Sean Palmerston for Exclaim!, "this time around it seems that Bardo Pond has got it all right. Basing song structures in heavy blues riffs (the natural beginning to the psychedelic movement anyway), the band moves away from confusing swirls of 1996’s Lapsed [sic] and streamlines their direction into more direct, harder-hitting songs. [...] Just don’t expect them to be touring with Fat Possum bands anytime soon – for my money, they’re still the closest thing left to real stoner rock since Sleep split up." CMJ New Music wrote that the album "rightly positions Bardo Pond among today's space-rock luminaries, but it also sees the band on a different course from some of its drone-rock colleagues [...] Where bands like Flying Saucer Attack work a decidedly celestial groove, as Bardo Pond has evolved, its grooves have become more scuzzy, vaguely blues-inspired and covered with a sticky layer of big-city grime, creosote and resin. It's space-rock at its stoned and sludgy best."

Despite a mixed score, AllMusic's Matt Kantor gave the album a very positive review, writing that "[t]he cilia-pulling strains of Set and Setting become utterly more infectious with each new spin [...] The band is at their most effective on instrumental cuts like "Datura" and the violin-based "Cross Current." Here, sounds get their most stretched out and visual. On the whole, [the album] is another cohesive step forward, a slow parade of seductive experimentation and noise that crawls on rock's foundation and doesn't care what anyone thinks. [...] Imagine then, Sonic Youth strewn across the desert on blotter acid; Set and Setting probably sounds something like that."

== Track listing ==
1. "Walking Stick Man" – 11:01
2. "This Time (So Fucked)" – 4:00
3. "Datura" – 8:02
4. "Again" – 6:33
5. "Lull" – 2:16
6. "Cross Current" – 6:36
7. "Crawl Away" – 9:26
8. "#3" – 1:14

== Personnel ==
- Isobel Sollenberger – Violin, Vocals
- John Gibbons – Synthesizer, Guitar, Percussion, Feedback
- Michael Gibbons – Synthesizer, Guitar, Producer
- Clint Takeda – Bass, Snake Guitar
- Ed Farnsworth – Drums (tracks 1, 3)
- Joe Culver – Drums (tracks 2, 4–8)

Additional personnel

- Dan Wittels – Harmonica (track 1)
- Jim Salamone – Mastering
