= Temple IV =

Studio album by Roy Montgomery
- Released: 1 January 1996
- Recorded: 15–22 January 1995
- Studios: 324 East 13th Street (New York City, US)
- Genres: Post-rock; psychedelic rock; space rock
- Length: 54:51
- Label: Kranky

Roy Montgomery chronology
Scenes from the South Island (1995)	Temple IV (1996)	And Now the Rain Sounds Like Life Is Falling Down Through It (1998)

Temple IV is the second studio album by guitarist and composer Roy Montgomery, released on 1 January 1996 by Kranky.

== Critical reception ==
Professional ratings
Review scores
Source	Rating
AllMusic	4.5/5 stars
Pitchfork	8.5/10

Reviewing the album for Pitchfork, Laura Snapes described it as "a psychedelic invocation of drone, noise, and the spiritual beyond" and wrote that the "music is as intensely physical as it is seemingly divine, as thrilling in its viscera as it is sensitive to the disembodying feeling of grief and the unexpected flashes of reanimation in its wake".

== Track listing ==
All music is composed by Roy Montgomery.

Temple IV track listing
No.	Title	Length
1.	"She Waits on Temple IV"	12:07
2.	"Departing the Body"	5:03
3.	"The Soul Quietens"	3:08
4.	"The Passage of Forms"	9:30
5.	"Jaguar Meets Snake"	7:54
6.	"Above the Canopy"	14:45
7.	"Jaguar Unseen"	2:24

== Personnel ==
Adapted from the Temple IV liner notes.

- Roy Montgomery – guitar

Production and additional personnel

- Brendan Burke – engineering
- Jessica Meyer – illustrations

== Release history ==
Release history and formats for Temple IV
Region	Date	Label	Format	Catalog
United States	1995	Kranky	CD	KRANK 009
