= Nepenthe (album) =

Studio album by Julianna Barwick
- Released: August 20, 2013
- Genre: Ambient; new-age
- Length: 41:39
- Label: Dead Oceans
- Producer: Alex Somers

Julianna Barwick chronology
The Magic Place (2011)	Nepenthe (2013)	Will (2016)

Nepenthe is the second studio album from American singer-songwriter Julianna Barwick. It was released in August 2013, under Dead Oceans Records.

== Critical reception ==
Professional ratings
Aggregate scores
Source	Rating
Metacritic	79/100
Review scores
Source	Rating
AllMusic	4.5/5 stars
Drowned in Sound	9/10
MusicOMH	4.5/5 stars
Pitchfork	8.5/10
Tiny Mix Tapes	4.5/5 stars

According to the review aggregator Metacritic, Nepenthe received "generally favorable reviews" based on a weighted average score of 79 out of 100 from 24 critic scores.

== Track listing ==
No.	Title	Length
1.	"Offing"	3:15
2.	"The Harbinger"	5:50
3.	"One Half"	3:41
4.	"Look into Your Own Mind"	4:36
5.	"Pyrrhic"	4:20
6.	"Labyrinthine"	4:32
7.	"Forever"	5:29
8.	"Adventurer of the Family"	2:57
9.	"Crystal Lake"	4:23
10.	"Waving to You"	2:36
Total length:		41:39

== Charts ==
Chart performance for Nepenthe
Chart (2013)	Peak position
UK Independent Albums (OCC)	42
US Heatseekers Albums (Billboard)	25
US New Age Albums (Billboard)	3
