= Hundreds of Days =

2018 studio album by Mary Lattimore

Studio album by Mary Lattimore
- Released: May 18, 2018
- Genre: Ambient
- Length: 47:59
- Label: Ghostly International

Mary Lattimore chronology
At the Dam (2016)	Hundreds of Days (2018)	New Rain Duets (2019)

Hundreds of Days is the third studio album by the American harpist Mary Lattimore. The album was recorded in California and features a wider instrumental range from her previous solo work. It was released on May 18, 2018, under Ghostly International, and received positive reviews from critics, who praised Lattimore's instrumentation and sound.

== Background and composition ==
Hundreds of Days originated during Lattimore's residence at the Headlands Center for the Arts in Marin County, California. Lattimore wanted to expand her instrumental range from her previous work, so along with the harp, her primary instrument, she played piano, synthesizers, and electric guitar on it. Lattimore admitted that she was not experienced in playing these other instruments when she started recording Hundreds of Days. She recorded the album in a redwood barn that was also in Marin County, as she felt more comfortable to experiment with her music in a secluded setting. During breaks in recording, Lattimore enjoyed hiking and reading. When writing the album's songs, she thought about her time living in Philadelphia prior to moving to California. Although she enjoyed living in California, she still missed Philadelphia and wanted to write songs as a means to help remember her time there.

"It Feels like Floating", the first track of Hundreds of Days, opens with a harp melody, with vocals and Moog synthesizers being added throughout the track's duration. "Never Saw Him Again" features sporadic drum sounds and "lengthy organ chords" Critics described the harp in "Baltic Birch" as having a dark sound, with the harp's strumming being complemented by "electric guitar flourishes". "Baltic Birch" also includes pitch-affecting delay effects, and was reportedly inspired by viewing "failed vacation towns along the Latvian coast". "Hello from the Edge of the Earth" features a harp melody "accenting cascading electronic hums". "Their Faces Filled With Light And Streaked With Pity" contains a harp melody accompanied by "washy guitars". According to Lattimore's publicist, the track's title came from Denis Johnson's short story collection Jesus' Son. "On the Day You Saw the Dead Whale" features a piano and harp playing together backed by synthesizers. The track's title was inspired by Lattimore seeing a dead whale beached on a shore. "Wind Carries Seed" was added as a bonus track.

== Critical reception ==
Professional ratings
Aggregate scores
Source	Rating
Metacritic	80/100
Review scores
Source	Rating
AllMusic	4/5 stars
Exclaim!	8/10
musicOMH	3.5/5 stars
Pitchfork	7.8/10
PopMatters	8/10
Tiny Mix Tapes	3.5/5 stars

According to the review aggregator Metacritic, Hundreds of Days received "generally favorable reviews" based on a weighted average score of 80 out of 100 from 9 critic scores.. Paul Simpson of AllMusic wrote that "Hundreds of Days finds Lattimore gracefully adapting to her new surroundings, adding new dimensions to her sound but keeping its dreaminess and sentimentality intact". Daniel Sylvester wrote in an Exclaim! review that "what makes Hundreds of Days such a engrossing listen lies in the way Mary Lattimore flawlessly combines both mood and mode". Ben Devlin of MusicOMH noted Hundreds of Days's "tranquil quality" and wrote that despite the "muddy" bass sound, "the mix is on the whole clear and pristine". In a Pitchfork review, Kevin Lozano praised the use of different instruments, stating that "By adding these new sounds to her trusty harp and looping pedals, [Lattimore has] expanded the possibilities of her music. The six songs on Hundreds of Days are the best she's recorded so far". Jared Skinner of PopMatters considered Hundreds of Days to "perhaps [be Lattimore's] best work to date. It is at once expansive and sprawling while retaining Lattimore's signature feeling of impassioned intimacy".

=== Accolades ===
Accolades for Hundreds of Days
Publication	Accolade	Rank	Ref.
Thrillist	Top 40 Albums of 2018	34	
Uncut	Best New Albums of 2018	49	

== Track listing ==
Hundreds of Days track listing
No.	Title	Length
1.	"It Feels Like Floating"	11:31
2.	"Never Saw Him Again"	7:30
3.	"Hello from the Edge of the Earth"	3:34
4.	"Baltic Birch"	9:32
5.	"Their Faces Streaked with Light and Filled with Pity"	2:43
6.	"On the Day You Saw the Dead Whale"	9:26
7.	"Wind Carries Seed"	3:43
Total length:		47:59

== Personnel ==
Credits adapted from liner notes.

- Mary Lattimore – performance, recording
- Jeff Zeigler – mixing
- James Plotkin – mastering
- Michael Cina – design, type
- Eric Hurtgen – flower illustrations
