= At the Dam =

Studio album by Mary Lattimore
- Released: March 4, 2016
- Genre: Electronic
- Length: 43:59
- Label: Ghostly International
- Producer: Mary Lattimore

Mary Lattimore chronology
The Withdrawing Room (2013)	At the Dam (2016)	Hundreds of Days (2018)

At the Dam is a solo studio album by American harpist Mary Lattimore. It was released on March 4, 2016, through Ghostly International. It received generally favorable reviews from critics.

== Background ==
Mary Lattimore is an American harpist originally from Asheville, North Carolina. In 2014, she received a fellowship from the Pew Center for Arts & Heritage. She used the grant to fund a road trip across the United States and created At the Dam with her harp and laptop. The album contains five tracks, clocking in at 44 minutes. The album's title is taken from an essay in Joan Didion's book, The White Album (1979), about the Hoover Dam. The album was released on March 4, 2016, through Ghostly International. Music videos were released for "Otis Walks into the Woods" and "Jimmy V".

== Critical reception ==
Professional ratings
Aggregate scores
Source	Rating
Metacritic	77/100
Review scores
Source	Rating
AllMusic	4/5 stars
Pitchfork	7.8/10
PopMatters	7/10

According to the review aggregator Metacritic, At the Dam received "generally favorable reviews" based on a weighted average score of 77 out of 100 from 4 critic scores.

Paul Simpson of AllMusic wrote, "The album sounds as billowing and ethereal as one would expect from a solo harpist, but Lattimore's sense of experimentation gives her a distinctive sound, and At the Dam is simply a magnificent album." Kevin Lozano of Pitchfork stated, "On its face a seemingly modest project, At the Dam bursts with ambition and ideas, offering a meditation on the ever-evolving relationship Lattimore has to her instrument and the spaces she shares it with." Matthew Fiander of PopMatters commented that "Lattimore delivers a haunting, lasting performance, one that feels solitary but never spare, alone but never lonesome."

=== Accolades ===
Year-end lists for At the Dam
Publication	List	Rank	Ref.
AllMusic	Favorite Electronic Albums	—	

== Track listing ==
All tracks are written by Mary Lattimore.

At the Dam track listing
No.	Title	Length
1.	"Otis Walks into the Woods"	9:40
2.	"Jimmy V"	5:57
3.	"The Quiet at Night"	4:12
4.	"Jaxine Drive"	10:53
5.	"Ferris Wheel, January"	13:17
Total length:		43:59

== Personnel ==
Credits adapted from liner notes.

- Mary Lattimore – harp, production, recording
- Rob Laakso – recording
- Jeff Zeigler – mixing
- James Plotkin – mastering
- Becky Suss – painting
- Michael Cina – design
