= The Allegory of Hearing =

Studio album by Roy Montgomery
- Released: 29 August 2000
- Recorded: October 1998 in Lyttelton, NZ
- Genre: Neo-psychedelia experimental rock
- Length: 47:17
- Label: Drunken Fish

Roy Montgomery chronology
324 E. 13th Street #7 (1999)	The Allegory of Hearing (2000)	Silver Wheel of Prayer (2001)

Professional ratings
Review scores
Source	Rating
Allmusic	4.5/5 stars

The Allegory of Hearing is the fourth studio album by Roy Montgomery, released on 29 August 2000 by Drunken Fish Records. The album artwork features a section of The Five Senses by Jan Brueghel the Elder and Peter Paul Rubens.

== Track listing ==
All tracks are written by Roy Montgomery

No.	Title	Length
1.	"Ex Cathedra"	2:48
2.	"Rock, Sea, Muse, Seek"	5:26
3.	"As the Dali Lama Was Remarking I Believe"	3:35
4.	"Sounding the Abyss"	2:36
5.	"I Hear You Mocking"	3:27
6.	"Where the Belltower Once Stood"	3:45
7.	"From a Promontory"	2:24
8.	"Resolution Island Suite" (I. A Vessel Sublime/II. And But a Gentle Swell/III. Hubris Fills the Rash and Young/IV. Now the Reef-Dashed Mariner/V. The Sirens, They Feel Pity/VI. Wind Upon The Sails, Light Upon the Sea/VII. Cast Away This Island, Cruel So, Fate Will Set Me Free)	17:37
9.	"At the Intersection of Herzog & Wenders"	3:52
10.	"Above All, Compassion"	1:47

== Personnel ==
Adapted from The Allegory of Hearing liner notes.

- Roy Montgomery – guitar, organ, mixing

Production and additional personnel

- Jan Breughel I – illustrations
- Arnold Van Bussell – engineering
- John Hill – illustrations
- Susanne Hill – illustrations

== Release history ==
Region	Date	Label	Format	Catalog
United States	2000	Drunken Fish	CD	DFR-47
