= Scenes from the South Island =

Studio album by Roy Montgomery
- Released: 5 September 1995
- Recorded: December 1994 – February 1995
- Studio: 324 East 13th Street (New York City, US)
- Genre: Post-rock
- Length: 51:51
- Label: Drunken Fish

Roy Montgomery chronology
| Scenes from the South Island (1995) | Temple IV (1996) |

Professional ratings
Review scores
| Source | Rating |
|---|---|
| AllMusic | 4/5 stars |

Scenes from the South Island is the debut studio album of guitarist and composer Roy Montgomery, released on 5 September 1995 by Drunken Fish Records. The album was remastered and reissued on 29 November 2019 by Liz Harris' label, Yellow Electric. The reissue includes three additional songs not present on the original release, and also clarifies the proper titles and running order of the original songs.

== Track listing ==
=== 1995 Release ===
All music is composed by Roy Montgomery

| No. | Title | Length |
|---|---|---|
| 1. | "Along the Main Divide" | 3:26 |
| 2. | "Clear Night, Port Hills" | 4:01 |
| 3. | "Twilight Conversation" | 10:04 |
| 4. | "Rainshadow Near Christchurch" | 5:06 |
| 5. | "Rain Receding" | 4:43 |
| 6. | "Escape Velocity" | 4:59 |
| 7. | "The Barracuda Sequence" | 1:47 |
| 8. | "Downtown to Vesuvio" | 1:23 |
| 9. | "The Road to Diamond Harbour" | 4:56 |
| 10. | "Winding It Out in the High Country" | 4:25 |
| 11. | "Norwester Head-On/The Last Kakapo Dreams of Flying" | 7:01 |

=== 2019 Reissue ===
All music is composed by Roy Montgomery

| No. | Title | Length |
|---|---|---|
| 1. | "Along the Main Divide" | 3:26 |
| 2. | "Clear Night, Port Hills" | 4:01 |
| 3. | "Twilight Conversation" | 10:04 |
| 4. | "Rainshadow Near Christchurch" | 5:04 |
| 5. | "Rain Receding" | 4:45 |
| 6. | "Escape Velocity" | 4:59 |
| 7. | "Downtown To Vesuvio" | 1:46 |
| 8. | "The Road to Diamond Harbour" | 1:22 |
| 9. | "Winding It Out in the High Country" | 4:55 |
| 10. | "Norwester Head-On" | 4:23 |
| 11. | "The Last Kakapo Dreams of Flying" | 6:51 |
| 12. | "Hollyford Valley Day 1" | 5:22 |
| 13. | "Hollyford Valley Day 2" | 5:52 |
| 14. | "Hollyford Valley Day 3" | 5:14 |

== Personnel ==
Adapted from the Scenes from the South Island liner notes.

- Roy Montgomery – guitar, EBow on "Twilight Conversation", mixing, recording

Production and additional personnel

- Brendan Burke – mixing
- Jessica Meyer – photography, design

== Release history ==
| Region | Date | Label | Format | Catalog |
|---|---|---|---|---|
| United States | 1995 | Drunken Fish | CD, LP | DFR-22 |
| United States | 2019 | Yellow Electric | LP, Bandcamp | |
