= Reyna Tropical =

American band

- Origin: Los Angeles, California, U.S.
- Genres: Tropical, Latin, Afro-indigenous, electronic
- Years active: 2016–present
- Label: Psychic Hotline
- Members: Fabi Reyna
- Past members: Nectali "Sumohair" Díaz
- Website: lareynatropical.com

Reyna Tropical is an American band founded by Fabi Reyna and Nectali "Sumohair" Díaz in 2016. Their music is influenced by Colombian, Peruvian, and Mexican musical styles, as well as Congolese rhythms. Reyna Tropical has released two EPs and one studio album. Since Díaz's death in 2022, Reyna has been the sole member of the band.

== History ==
Fabi Reyna and Nectali Díaz were both born in Mexico and raised in the US. Reyna is the founder of She Shreds Media and has played guitar professionally with bands including Priests, Raveena, and Sleater-Kinney. Díaz was a DJ and producer, and was active in the nightclub scene in Los Angeles. The pair met at a Red Bull Music Academy event in 2016, where they bonded over a shared appreciation for Bomba Estéreo. In early recording sessions Díaz encouraged Reyna to sing, which she wasn't previously comfortable doing.

=== 2018–2022: Career as a duo ===
Reyna Tropical self-released their first EP Reyna Tropical in January 2018. It was called "refreshingly succinct and buoyant" by NPR. The tracks were initially recorded in a series of 4-hour improvised sessions. In December 2018 Reyna Tropical supported Bomba Estéreo on their US Jungla Tour, after being invited to do so by lead singer Li Saumet.

In March 2019, Reyna Tropical performed at the opening party of SXSW Music Festival, and in April they played at Estéreo Beach Festival in Santa Marta, Colombia. Reyna and Díaz's experiences with nature in Colombia inspired their second EP Sol y Lluvia, which they released in August 2019. Similarly to the first EP, the tracks were initially recorded in improvised sessions.

Nectali Díaz died unexpectedly in July 2022. In a 2023 interview, Reyna said that "for several months I didn’t know how to perform on stage without him, or how to write music without him...it left me with the question of, "How is this going to continue? Is this fair, is this what he wants?" But the answer was always a resounding yes." The first song that Reyna wrote after Díaz's death was "Ya Va Pasar", using a beat created by Díaz, and the song was released as a single on independent record label Psychic Hotline in November 2023.

=== 2022–present: Malegría ===
In March 2024, Reyna Tropical's debut album Malegría was released on Psychic Hotline. The album includes material that Reyna and Díaz had been working on together as far back as July 2020. The title of the album is a portmanteau of the Spanish words mal (bad) and alegría (happiness), and was taken from the title of a Manu Chao song. Isabelia Herrera of Pitchfork described Malegría as "an incisive exploration of the porosity of diasporic life", and rated it 7.7/10. Herrera also wrote that the album contains influences of chicha, zapateado, and soukous rhythms. PopMatters rated the album 8/10, and called it a "wild creation." Anne Lorenz of Westdeutscher Rundfunk described the album as "a stormy celebration of queer Afro culture." Reyna Tropical toured with Portugal. The Man to support the album, and performed at Newport Folk Festival in July 2024. In 2026, Reyna Tropical released a collaborative album with Helado Negro, entitled Helado Tropical.

== Musical style and themes ==
Reyna Tropical's music takes influence from traditional Latin American and African rhythms and musical styles. In an article for BrooklynVegan, Bill Pearis described Malegría as incorporating "musical styles from all over the Southern hemisphere, including Congolese, Peruvian, Colombian grooves," and Fabi Reyna named tracks by Manu Chao, Priya Ragu, Café Tacvba, and Dennis Brown as influences on the album. In 2024 Reyna told Alternative Press that "recently, my influences have formed to become folks that play in West Africa, in the Congo, soukous, champeta, chicha, Peruvian cumbia, and those folks are mimicking bird sounds and a lot of nature sounds." Richard Villegas of Remezcla wrote that "influences from champeta, buyerengue [sic] and ancestral chanting can be heard across Reyna Tropical’s small but vibrant catalogue." According to Emilly Prado of NPR, Reyna Tropical "highlight and reimagine the multicultural influences of their childhoods through Afro-Mexican melodies, cumbias spanning from Mexico to Peru, and expert digital mixing."

=== Improvisation ===
Both of Reyna Tropical's EPs began as improvised sessions between Reyna and Díaz. Reyna has said that "my creative process often involves being in Colombia, learning from local people, recording on the beach with my interface and guitar, improvising lyrics on the spot."

=== Culture and identity ===
Fabi Reyna sees her mixed cultural heritage as fundamental to her music. In 2019 she said that "when I met Sumo, we blended our worlds of music and activism, where I focus on queer identity and being a Mexican woman living in America." Díaz was Afro-Mexican, and the band had a motto of "Queer Love and Afro-Mexico", which Rolling Stone described as being "at the heart of their music".

Reyna has described Reyna Tropical as "a project that explores diasporic experiences," and said that the album Malegría focuses on the process of "learning to trust myself and discovering the power of being a mestiza woman." In another interview she said that "I am a mixture of many worlds, so my art...brings together all the worlds, all the diasporic experiences of my own life."

== Discography ==
=== Albums ===
- Malegría (2024, Psychic Hotline)
- Helado Tropical (with Helado Negro, as Helado Tropical; Psychic Hotline, 2026)

=== Extended plays ===
- Reyna Tropical (2018, self-released)
- Sol y Lluvia (2019, self-released)

=== Singles ===
- "Oro" (2018, self-released)
- "Como Fuego" (2019, self-released)
- "Dolor" (2020, self-released)
- "Ya Va Pasar" (2023, Psychic Hotline)
