= Silver Ladders (album) =

Studio album by Mary Lattimore
- Released: October 9, 2020
- Length: 40:18
- Label: Ghostly International

Mary Lattimore chronology
New Rain Duets (2019)	Silver Ladders (2020)	Goodbye, Hotel Arkada (2023)

Silver Ladders is the fourth studio album by American harpist Mary Lattimore. It was released on October 9, 2020 under the Ghostly International label. Produced by Slowdive's Neil Halstead, it has been described as the album where Lattimore "sets herself apart as a bright innovator who pushes expectation."

== Critical reception ==
Professional ratings
Aggregate scores
Source	Rating
Metacritic	85/100
Review scores
Source	Rating
AllMusic	5/5 stars
The Line of Best Fit	8/10
musicOMH	5/5 stars
Pitchfork	7.7/10

Silver Ladders was met with favorable reviews from critics. At Metacritic, which assigns a weighted average rating out of 100 to reviews from mainstream publications, this release received an average score of 85, based on 10 reviews, which indicates "universal acclaim".

=== Accolades ===
The album was included in 13 best-albums-of-2020 lists, including those by The New Yorker, Drowned in Sound, NPR Music, The Quietus, The Wire, BrooklynVegan, Gorilla vs. Bear, Pitchfork, AllMusic and XLR8R.

== Track listing ==
Silver Ladders track listing
No.	Title	Length
1.	"Pine Trees"	3:20
2.	"Silver Ladders"	3:45
3.	"Til a Mermaid Drags You Under"	10:26
4.	"Sometimes He's in My Dreams"	3:46
5.	"Chop on the Climbout"	5:57
6.	"Don't Look"	8:03
7.	"Thirty Tulips"	4:58
