= Silver Wheel of Prayer =

Studio album by Roy Montgomery
- Released: 13 February 2001
- Recorded: October 1998 in Lyttelton, New Zealand
- Genre: Neo-psychedelia
- Length: 52:08
- Label: VHF

Roy Montgomery chronology
The Allegory of Hearing (2000)	Silver Wheel of Prayer (2001)	Inroads: New and Collected Works (2007)

Professional ratings
Review scores
Source	Rating
Allmusic	4/5 stars
Alternative Press	3.5/5 stars

Silver Wheel of Prayer is the fifth album by guitarist and composer Roy Montgomery, released on 13 February 2001 through VHF Records.

== Track listing ==
All tracks are written by Roy Montgomery

No.	Title	Length
1.	"for the Imperiled"	4:21
2.	"for the Disoriented"	4:14
3.	"for the Mortified"	4:32
4.	"for the Dispossessed"	7:21
5.	"for the Intense"	8:21
6.	"for the Circulation"	6:45
7.	"for a Small Blue Orb"	16:35

== Personnel ==
- Arnold Van Bussell – engineering
- Roy Montgomery – guitar, EBow, organ, mixing
