= Bufo Alvarius, Amen 29:15 =

Bufo Alvarius

Studio album by Bardo Pond
- Released: January 1995
- Recorded: October 1993 – December 1994
- Genre: Psychedelic rock; noise rock; shoegaze; post-rock; drone
- Length: 72:37
- Label: Drunken Fish Records (US); Ché Trading (original UK release); Fire (2010 UK reissue)
- Producer: Bardo Pond, Art Difuria

Bardo Pond chronology
Bufo Alvarius (1995)	Amanita (1996)

Professional ratings
Review scores
Source	Rating
AllMusic	4/5 stars
Drowned in Sound	8/10
Record Collector	4/5 stars

Bufo Alvarius, also known as Bufo alvarius, amen 29:15, is the debut studio album by Bardo Pond, released in 1995 by Drunken Fish Records. It takes its name from the toad whose skin contains the psychoactive substance 5-MeO-DMT.

== Reception ==
Trouser Press praised the album, with Deborah Sprague writing that it is "every bit as synapse-destroying as its namesake. More consistently aggressive than like-minded drone-dreamers Magic Hour and Spiritualized, Bardo Pond recalls Hawkwind’s headier days in psychedelic sludgestorms like the half-hour-long “Amen 29:15.” The bottom-end heft is countered by Sollenberger’s ethereal vocals — which bear a passing resemblance to that of Renaissance art-rock songbird Annie Haslam — and her playing, which is so striking that it just about absolves the flute for the sins of Ian Anderson." According to Ned Raggett writing for AllMusic: "The slow, stony pace that "Adhesive" establishes for Bufo Alvarius Amen 29:15 continues through the album's remaining tracks, but in such a way that Bardo Pond rapidly become their own band and not merely the sum of their influences. There's something about the combination of lo-fi crunch, post-shoegaze bliss-out, stoner Quaalude head-nodding, and Loop/Spacemen 3-inspired drone that's truly unique."

=== Legacy ===
The album has continued to receive acclaim throughout the years. Of the album's lack of commercial success, Noel Gardner of The Quietus wrote in retrospect: "It's not hard to see why: clearly, they were never going to make mass consumption music, but they sounded like pretty much nothing else out there. In the main, they still don't." "Bufo Alvarius didn't just stand out like the proverbial sore thumb when first released 15 years ago," wrote Dom Gourlay for Drowned in Sound, "but actually sounds wholly unique today, its only close compatriots probably being White Hills' Glitter Glammer Atrocity or Earth's The Bees Made Honey In The Lion's Skull. However, where both the former and the latter proffer power and sound expansion over tenacity, Bardo Pond are one of those outfits where the adjective 'experimental' genuinely means what it says on the tin." Italian magazine OndaRock named it one of their "milestone" albums, with Francesco Alti calling it a "strongly modern work, [...] of a classic, timeless beauty." The magazine's editors would go on to rank it the 34th best psychedelic album of all time (a spot it shares with Rolling Stones' Their Satanic Majesties Request).

== Track listing ==
All tracks are written by Bardo Pond.

No.	Title	Length
1.	"Adhesive"	4:34
2.	"Back Porch"	4:51
3.	"On a Side Street"	7:24
4.	"Capillary River"	6:22
5.	"No Time to Waste"	6:57
6.	"Absence"	8:36
7.	"Vent"	4:41
8.	"Amen"	29:12

2010 Remastered CD bonus track
No.	Title	Length
9.	"Fixed"	5:31

== Personnel ==
Adapted from the Bufo Alvarius, Amen 29:15 liner notes.

Bardo Pond

- Joe Culver – drums, vocals (1)
- John Gibbons – guitar, vocals (4)
- Michael Gibbons – guitar, vocals (3)
- Isobel Sollenberger – leads vocals, flute
- Clint Takeda – bass guitar (8)

Production and additional personnel

- Bardo Pond – production
- Art Difuria – production, engineering

== Release history ==
Region	Date	Label	Format	Catalog
United States	1995	Drunken Fish Records	CD, LP	DFR-15
United Kingdom	2010	Fire Records	CD, LP	FIRE 137
United States	2022	Fire Records	LP	FIRELP137X
