= Well Oiled (Hash Jar Tempo album) =

Studio album by Hash Jar Tempo
- Released: March 17, 1997
- Studio: Firenze Tavern (Philadelphia, PA)
- Length: 78:21
- Label: Drunken Fish

Hash Jar Tempo chronology
| Well Oiled (1997) | Under Glass (1999) |

Professional ratings
Review scores
| Source | Rating |
|---|---|
| AllMusic | 4/5 stars |

Well Oiled is the first recorded collaboration between Bardo Pond and Roy Montgomery, released under the name Hash Jar Tempo on March 17, 1997 by Drunken Fish Records.

== Reception ==
Ned Raggett of AllMusic praised the album, writing that "it very much is what is promised, a collaboration between Roy Montgomery and Bardo Pond that lives up to the experimental and exploratory heights both are easily capable of. [...] Unlike the group's semi-namesake, Hash Jar Tempo doesn't punish and haunt so much as it does engagingly trip out, with the right head-nodding pace and echoing chimes that will attract both older stoners and younger shoegaze freaks. There are certainly some pretty intense moments, though -- the fourth track is one of the best, a subtly relentless freakout that feels like slow magma crushing everything before it, with some wild guitar work deep in the mix." Italian magazine OndaRock named it one of their "milestone" albums, with Francesco Nunziata calling the album a "masterpiece" & comparing the music to acts as diverse as Popol Vuh, Klaus Schulze, Chrome & early Pink Floyd. The magazine's editors would go on to rank it the 17th best psychedelic album of all time.

== Track listing ==
| No. | Title | Length |
|---|---|---|
| 1. | "[Untitled]" | 13:33 |
| 2. | "[Untitled]" | 1:58 |
| 3. | "[Untitled]" | 13:05 |
| 4. | "[Untitled]" | 11:09 |
| 5. | "[Untitled]" | 13:51 |
| 6. | "[Untitled]" | 18:44 |
| 7. | "[Untitled]" | 6:01 |
| Total length: | | 78:21 |

== Personnel ==
Adapted from the Well Oiled liner notes.

Hash Jar Tempo

- Joe Culver – drums
- John Gibbons – guitar
- Michael Gibbons – guitar
- Roy Montgomery – guitar
- Clint Takeda – bass guitar

Production and additional personnel

- Drugfish – art direction

== Release history ==
| Region | Date | Label | Format | Catalog |
|---|---|---|---|---|
| United States | 1997 | Drunken Fish | CD | DFR-24 |
