= Helado Negro =

American musician

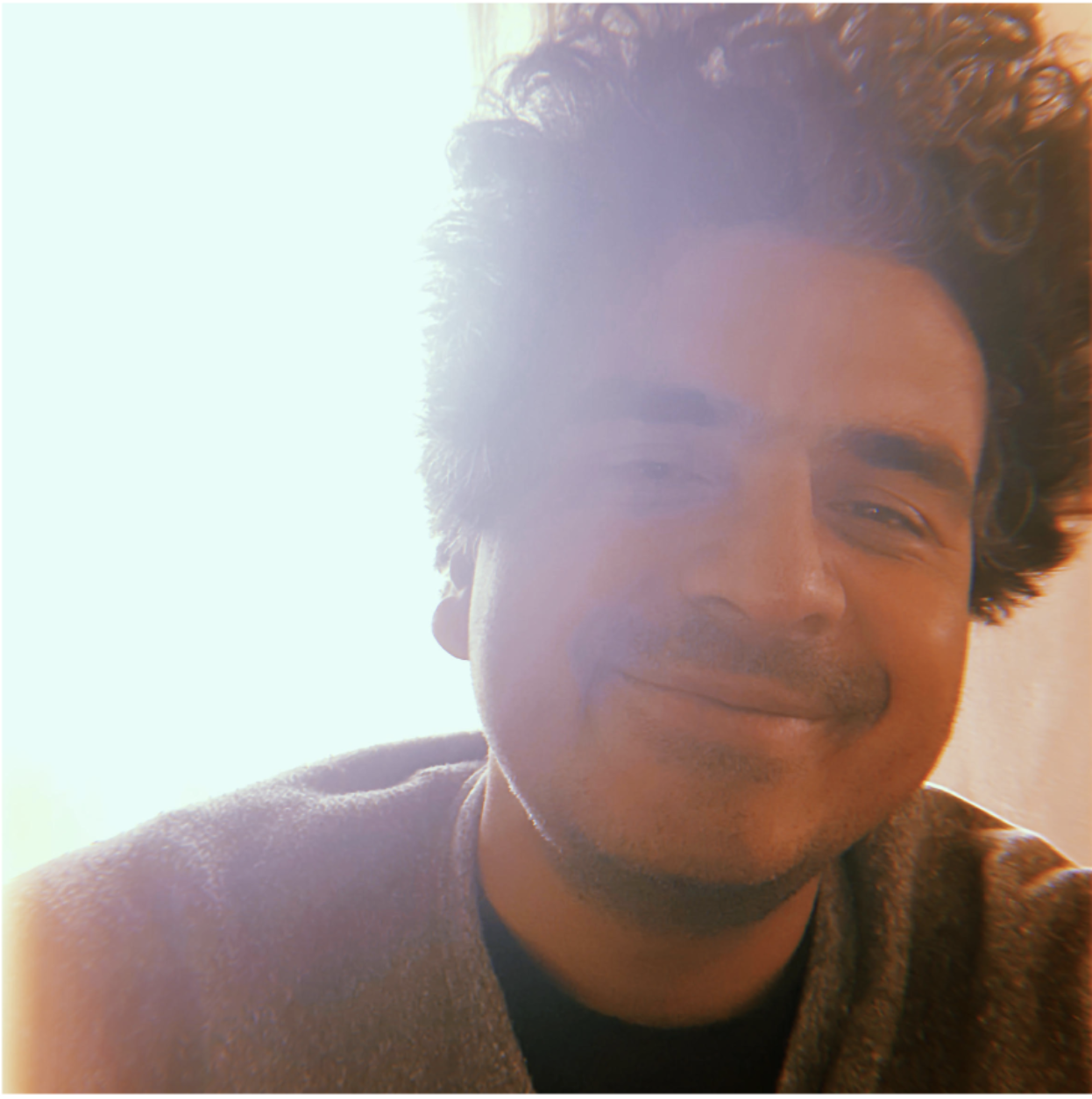
- Helado Negro in 2020

Background information
- Born: Roberto Carlos Lange; 1980 (age 45–46); Florida, United States
- Genres: Latin; folk; experimental; electronic
- Instruments: Vocals; guitar; synthesizer; DAW; sampler
- Years active: 2009–present
- Labels: Asthmatic Kitty; Big Dada; RVNG Intl.; 4AD
- Member of: Ombre
- Website: heladonegro.com

Roberto Carlos Lange (born 1980), better known by his stage name Helado Negro, is an American musician. In 2015, he received a Joyce Foundation award. In 2019, he was awarded a United States Artists Fellow in Music and also the recipient of a 2019 Grants to Artists award in Music from the Foundation for Contemporary Arts.

Lange's songs are bilingual in English and Spanish and explore Latino identity, drawing on his upbringing in South Florida as the child of Ecuadoran immigrants.

Helado Negro released his 2019 album This Is How You Smile through RVNG Intl., a Brooklyn-based music institution. This Is How You Smile received an 8.5 rating and Best New Music from Pitchfork.

== Early life ==
The son of Ecuadoran immigrants, Helado Negro (Roberto Carlos Lange) was born in South Florida in 1980. He grew up in Lauderhill and Davie.

As a high school student during the early 1990s, Roberto Carlos Lange would stay up late watching Liquid Television on MTV. Intrigued by the experimental videos and animation he saw there, he "was fascinated by the mystery of how they were made, and was curious as to how to make them."

In 1999, he enrolled at the Savannah College of Art and Design (SCAD) in Savannah, Georgia, to study Computer Art and Sound Design. His sound studies focused on installation, performance and experimental art. During his time at SCAD, he participated in experimental sound and art shows, and he began to develop his musical work by purchasing an MPC sampler to create music. He graduated in 2003 with a B.F.A. in Computer Art from SCAD.

== Career ==
Helado released his first full-length album in 2009 titled Awe Owe.

In 2010, Helado released an EP titled Pasajero.

Helado released his second full-length album in 2011 titled Canta Lechuza.

In 2012, Helado released the first of a three part EP, titled Island Universe Story – One.

He is a member of Ombre, along with Julianna Barwick. The duo released Believe You Me in 2012.

Helado released his third full-length album in 2013 titled Invisible Life. Helado released the second Island Universe Story EP in 2013. In 2014, Helado released his fourth full-length album titled Double Youth. The third EP in Helado's three-part Island Universe Story series was released in 2014.

In 2015, Helado released the single "Young, Latin and Proud" along with an animated-visual and lyric video. Lange describes the song as "It was as if I was singing my 6-year-old self a lullaby... It's about feeling a sense of pride and self-confidence, understanding that you're born into something and it's alright to feel good about it. Stereotypes and contradictions are built into identity and I think those are a strong current in both Latino and black identity in the U.S. today."

In 2016, Helado released his fifth full-length album titled Private Energy. In this record, Helado exposes his vulnerabilities, stating "There's so much that is special [and] fragile about us... We're vulnerable and scared to share with people. I'm just sharing my own vulnerable shit. The hardest part is talking to somebody else about it. I'm the worst person to sum things up with words but the best [way] to sum it up is with music, you know?"

In 2019, he released his sixth studio album titled This Is How You Smile. "Roberto Carlos Lange's sixth and best album as Helado Negro deepens and expands upon the imagistic nature of his lyrics and cosmic synth-folk. It is a sublime, masterful piece of music."

He then released Far In (2021) and Phasor (2024).

In 2026, Helado and Reyna Tropical released a collaborative album entitled Helado Tropical.

== Visual and sound art ==
In 2007, Lange collaborated with visual artist David Ellis to create "Trash Talk" for a Christian Marclay curated show at the ICA Philly. Sonic trash bags created by David Ellis rattled and bumped like a percussion team, put together out of garbage bags, cans, bottles, cardboard, plastic, paper, aluminum, tin, foam, wire, hardware, and electronics. The sequence was composed in collaboration with Roberto Lange. Together they collaborated on works that featured at Zoo Art Fair, NADA Art Fair, and Roebling Hall. Some of these pieces included : "All Purpose Primer" (2007), "Trash Talk (2007), "Hell's Angel (2008), and "Liberty".

The duo's collaborations extended into video as well, with Lange contributing the sonic score to several of Ellis's visual motion paintings; these pieces were created on-site including a commission by the clothing retailer Theory to create new works of art. Lange would sample and manipulate sound as it was being generated acoustically from Ellis's movements and incidental sounds while painting.

In 2009, Lange scored the collaborative work by Blu and Ellis called "combo".

In 2011, Lange contributed a site-specific sound sculpture called "HVAC Music Box", for the "Sequence of Waves" group show at Saint Cecilia's Convent in Greenpoint, Brooklyn. The HVAC Music Box is a piece that uses the idea of an HVAC unit as a resonator to circulate the sound of music boxes that are activated by viewers. The composition in the music box is an original piece that is on a continuous loop that is only advanced by turning the knobs. This is a manual kinetic sculpture. The sculpture was made for a site-specific group show called Sequence of Waves that was installed at the St. Cecilia Convent in Greenpoint, NY for one day only.

Also in 2011, Lange was commissioned by Flux Projects to create a week-long site-specific installation that involved sound in a public space. The piece he created was called "Sounding Up There".

== Notable events ==
In July 2017, Helado performed an NPR Music Tiny Desk Concert. It is posted on the NPR Music YouTube channel, which has over 3 million subscribers. He performed four songs: "Transmission Listen", "Young, Latin and Proud", "Run Around" and "It's My Brown Skin", accompanied by a 5-piece band consisting of drums, two saxophones, violin, synthesizer, with Helado singing and playing guitar.

== Discography ==
=== Studio albums ===
- Awe Owe (Asthmatic Kitty, 2009)
- Canta Lechuza (Asthmatic Kitty, 2011)
- Believe You Me (with Julianna Barwick, as Ombre; Asthmatic Kitty, 2012)
- Invisible Life (Asthmatic Kitty, 2013)
- Double Youth (Asthmatic Kitty, 2014)
- Private Energy (Asthmatic Kitty, 2016)
- Private Energy Expanded Edition (RVNG Intl., 2017)
- This Is How You Smile (RVNG Intl., 2019)
- Far In (4AD, 2021)
- Phasor (4AD, 2024)
- Helado Tropical (with Reyna Tropical, as Helado Tropical; Psychic Hotline, 2026)

=== Live albums ===
- Live at KCRW (RVNG Intl., 2019)

=== EPs ===
- Pasajero (self-released, 2010)
- Island Universe Story – One (Asthmatic Kitty, 2012)
- Island Universe Story – Two (Asthmatic Kitty, 2013)
- Island Universe Story – Three (Asthmatic Kitty, 2014)
- Island Universe Story – Four (RVNG Intl., 2018)
- The Last Sound on Earth (Big Dada, 2025)
