= Julianna Barwick =

American musician

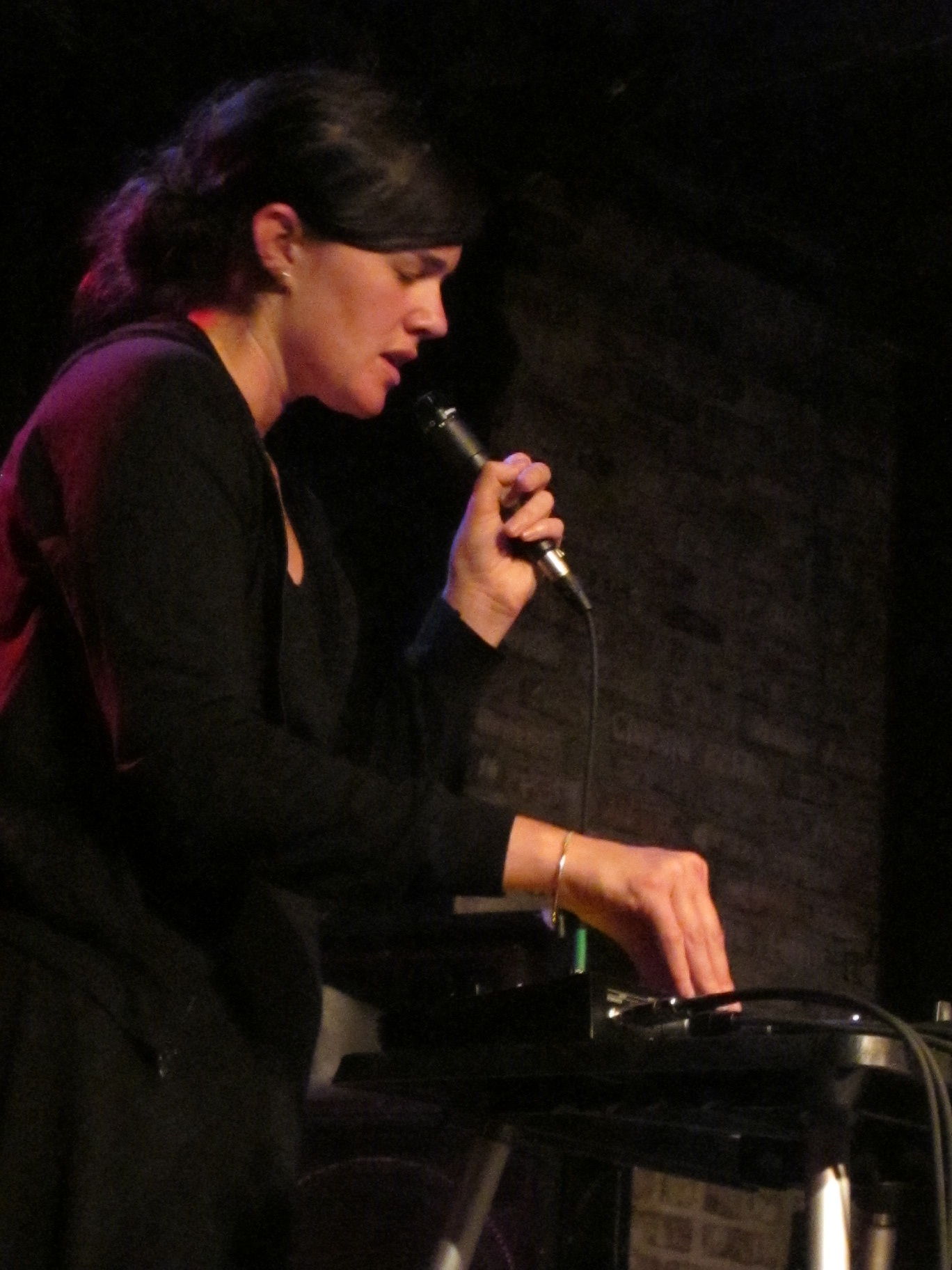
- Barwick in 2010

Background information
- Born: Louisiana, U.S
- Origin: Missouri, U.S
- Genres: Ambient; new age; electronic; avant-garde
- Occupation: Musician
- Years active: 2006–present
- Labels: Dead Oceans; Asthmatic Kitty; InFiné; Mistletone
- Member of: Ombre
- Website: juliannabarwick.com

Julianna Barwick is an American ambient musician who composes using electronic loops and layered vocals. Her music is primarily choral in nature. Her debut studio album, The Magic Place, was released in 2011.

== Music career ==
Barwick has said that her music is influenced by her participation in church choir while growing up in Missouri. She composes with a machine to create electronic loops built around her vocalizing.

She self-released her debut EP, Sanguine, in 2006. The songs are wordless with vocal overdubs, vocal percussion, and improvisation. On the EP, Florine, she uses a loop station and pedals to create minimalist repetition accompanied by layers of vocals and synthesizers. In 2010, Barwick was commissioned to remix "Reckoner" by Radiohead. During the next year, she released an album of improvisational music, FRKWYS Vol. 6, with Ikue Mori.

She recorded her first full-length album, The Magic Place, on a rehearsal stage because it was soundproof and had a piano. The title of the album refers to a tree on her family's farm that was big enough to crawl into, as though the tree contained rooms shaped by the trunk and branches. In 2012, she formed the duo Ombre with Helado Negro and recorded the album Believe You Me.

The title of her second album, Nepenthe, was inspired by the death of a relative. The name comes from the drug of forgetfulness found in ancient Greek literature and the work of Edgar Allan Poe. The album features the string ensemble Amiina and a choir of teenage girls.

In 2016, the song "Nebula", from her third album Will premiered on NPR. A music video directed by Derrick Belcham was shot at the historic Philip Johnson Glass House.

On December 20, 2019, she released an EP, titled Circumstance Synthesis, and in July 2020 she released her fourth album Healing Is a Miracle.

In 2026, Barwick released a collaborative album with Mary Lattimore, titled Tragic Magic, through InFiné which includes Barwick's vocals and whistling.

== Discography ==
=== Solo studio albums ===
Title	Album details	Peak chart positions	
Title	Album details	US Heat.	New Age Albums
The Magic Place	Released: February 21, 2011; Label: Asthmatic Kitty; Formats: CD, LP, digital download, streaming	—	4
Nepenthe	Released: August 20, 2013; Label: Dead Oceans; Formats: CD, LP, digital download, streaming	25	3
Will	Released: May 6, 2016; Label: Dead Oceans; Formats: CD, LP, digital download, streaming	21	3
Healing Is a Miracle	Released: July 11, 2020; Label: Ninja Tune; Formats: CD, LP, digital download, streaming	—	—

=== Collaborative studio albums ===
Title	Album details
FRKWYS Vol. 6 (with Ikue Mori)	Released: June 14, 2011; Label: RVNG Intl.; Formats: LP, digital download, streaming
Believe You Me (with Helado Negro, as Ombre)	Released: August 21, 2012; Label: Asthmatic Kitty; Formats: LP, digital download, streaming
Tragic Magic (with Mary Lattimore)	Released: January 16, 2026; Label: InFiné; Formats: CD, LP, digital download, streaming

=== EPs ===
Title	Details
Sanguine	Released: 2006
Florine	Released: April 27, 2009
Matrimony Remixes	Released: October 4, 2011
Pacing	Released: March 5, 2013
Rosabi	Released: June 3, 2014
Circumstance Synthesis	Released: December 20, 2019
