= Buscabulla =

Band formed of Luis Alfredo Del Valle and Raquel Berrios

- Origin: New York City/Puerto Rico
- Genres: Latin, electronic, psychedelic pop
- Years active: 2014–present
- Labels: Kitsuné, Ribbon Music
- Members: Luis Alfredo Del Valle; Raquel Berrios
- Website: https://www.buscabulla.com/

Buscabulla is a band formed by Luis Alfredo Del Valle and Raquel Berrios. Their music has been described as tropical synth pop, electro-pop, indie pop, electro-Caribbean, and experimental. They incorporate Latin music styles such as salsa, reggaeton, bachata, merengue and calypso.

== History ==
Luis Alfredo Del Valle and Raquel Berrios were both born in Puerto Rico but lived for many years in New York City where they met in 2011 and formed the band Buscabulla. They were based in Brooklyn for 6 years before returning to Puerto Rico.

Their first EP, named Buscabulla, and produced by English musician Dev Hynes, was released on Kitsuné, while their second EP, named EP II, was self-released. On this second EP they collaborated with American musician Helado Negro for the track "Frío". They also went on tour with Helado Negro in 2016. Buscabulla were included in Rolling Stone's list of 10 new artists you need to know in 2017.

After Hurricane Maria hit Puerto Rico in September 2017, they decided to return to the island. This inspired their album, Regresa, which explored the emotional impact of returning to a devastated home. Regresa was released on May 8, 2020 on Ribbon Music with additional production by Patrick Wimberly. It includes collaborations with Nick Hakim, legendary Puerto Rican singer Nydia Caro and Helado Negro. It was described by Pitchfork as "joyful and melancholic", by NME as "a magnificent rumination on those emotions" (of rage and hope), and by NPR as "swoonily alluring" and "freighted with melancholy". Regresa was included as No. 21 in NPR's list of the 50 best albums of 2020 The Chicago Reader said that Regresa offered "sophisticated reflections on anxiety, estrangement, and returning home". Regresa peaked at number 15 on the Billboard Latin Pop Albums chart.

== Discography ==
=== Studio albums ===
- Regresa (2020)
- Se Amaba Así (2025)

=== Extended plays ===
- Buscabulla (2014)
- EP II (2017)
