= Goodbye, Hotel Arkada =

Studio album by Mary Lattimore
- Released: October 6, 2023
- Length: 38:59
- Label: Ghostly
- Producer: Mary Lattimore

Mary Lattimore chronology
Silver Ladders (2020)	Goodbye, Hotel Arkada (2023)

Singles from Goodbye, Hotel Arkada
- 1. "And Then He Wrapped His Wings Around Me" Released: August 2, 2023; 2. "Horses, Glossy on the Hill" Released: September 6, 2023

Goodbye, Hotel Arkada is the fifth studio album by American harpist Mary Lattimore. It was released on October 6, 2023, through Ghostly. It features contributions by Lol Tolhurst of The Cure, Rachel Goswell of Slowdive, Roy Montgomery, and Meg Baird, amongst others.

== Background ==
Lattimore announced the album on August 2, 2023. The "Hotel Arkada" is a Croatian lodging "renovated out of its old-world charm". Located on the island Hvar, it describes a big old hotel that has been "hosting holiday-goers for decades in a great way", according to Lattimore. As she walked around the lobby and the ballroom, it gave her the impression of a "well-worn, well-loved place". Her friend Stacy then told her to "say goodbye to Hotel Arkada", as it might not be here when Lattimore returns. The hotel was in fact renovated soon thereafter, effectively losing its old charm. The musician attributes the songs on the album to motifs of evanescence, such as "fading flowers in vases" or "getting older", a general sentiment of things changing "while you're away". She seeks to "maintain sensitivity" and not "sink into hollow despondency".

The lead single "And Then He Wrapped His Wings Around Me" was released the same day and features Meg Baird and Walt McClements. Lattimore shared a second single title "Horses, Glossy on the Hill" on September 6. In promotion of the album, Lattimore will embark on a 30-date tour through the United States, starting on September 24.

== Critical reception ==
Professional ratings
Aggregate scores
Source	Rating
Metacritic	80/100
Review scores
Source	Rating
AllMusic	4.5/5 stars
MusicOMH	4/5 stars
Pitchfork	6.9/10

Goodbye, Hotel Arkada was met with "generally favorable" reviews from critics. At Metacritic, which assigns a weighted average rating out of 100 to reviews from mainstream publications, this release received an average score of 80, based on 9 reviews.

Vanessa Ague of Pitchfork stated that Lattimore "invites an array of collaborators to help craft pensive songs that grow out of moments past" and "while her instrument's luminous tone remains the music's defining characteristic, she embraces a darker mood than before".

== Track listing ==
All tracks are written by Mary Lattimore, except where noted.

Goodbye, Hotel Arkada track listing
No.	Title	Length
1.	"And Then He Wrapped His Wings Around Me"	5:23
2.	"Arrivederci" (Lattimore, Laurence Tolhurst)	5:11
3.	"Blender in a Blender" (Lattimore, Roy Montgomery)	6:39
4.	"Music for Applying Shimmering Eye Shadow"	5:39
5.	"Horses, Glossy on the Hill"	7:09
6.	"Yesterday's Parties"	8:58
Total length:		38:59

== Personnel ==
- Mary Lattimore – production, engineering
- James Plotkin – mastering
- Trevor Spencer – mixing
- Becky Suss – artwork
- Michael Cina – design
- Meg Baird – featured artist (track 1)
- Walt McClements – featured artist (1)
- Lol Tolhurst – featured artist (2)
- Roy Montgomery – featured artist (3)
- Rachel Goswell – featured artist (6)
- Samara Lubelski – featured artist (6)
