= Hash Jar Tempo =

Roy Montgomery-Bardo Pond collaboration

Background information
- Origin: Philadelphia, Pennsylvania, USA
- Genres: Experimental music, Psychedelia
- Years active: 1995, 1998
- Labels: Drunken Fish
- Past members: Joe Culver; John Gibbons; Michael Gibbons; Roy Montgomery; Isobel Sollenberger; Clint Takeda

Hash Jar Tempo is a collaborative musical project between the members of Philadelphia-based psychedelic band Bardo Pond and experimental guitarist and composer Roy Montgomery. The band was founded in March 1995 and have released two albums, Well Oiled and Under Glass, and have never toured.

== History ==
In 1995, Montgomery was introduced to the members of Bardo Pond, who were already familiar with Roy Montgomery's Dadamah project. On March 26, members of Bardo Pond and Montgomery entered the studio and recorded a completely improvised session. The improvised pieces from that session would be released two years later as Well Oiled under the name Hash Jar Tempo, a pun on the band name Ash Ra Tempel. When Montgomery returned to the States, the band reunited and recorded another improvised session on April 27, 1998, this time with Isobel's participation. The band released the music on their final album Under Glass the following year.

== Band members ==
Former members

- Joe Culver – drums (1995, 1998)
- John Gibbons – guitar (1995, 1998)
- Michael Gibbons – guitar (1995, 1998)
- Roy Montgomery – guitar (1995, 1998)
- Isobel Sollenberger – flute (1998)
- Clint Takeda – bass guitar (1995, 1998)

== Discography ==
Studio albums

- Well Oiled (Drunken Fish, 1997)
- Under Glass (Drunken Fish, 1999)
