= Roy Montgomery =

New Zealand musician

- Born: 1959 (age 66–67); London, England
- Origin: Christchurch, New Zealand
- Genres: Neo-psychedelia; post-rock; experimental rock
- Occupations: Musician, professor
- Instruments: Vocals, guitar, keyboards
- Years active: 1980–present
- Labels: Drunken Fish, Kranky, Grapefruit
- Formerly of: Dadamah; Hash Jar Tempo; The Pin Group; Dissolve

Roy Montgomery (born 1959) is a composer, guitarist and lecturer from Christchurch, New Zealand. Montgomery's mostly instrumental solo works have elements of post-rock, lo-fi, folk and avant-garde experimentation. His signature sound might be described as atmospheric or cinematic, often featuring complex layers of chiming, echoing and/or droning guitar phrases. He is currently head of the environmental management department at Lincoln University in New Zealand.

Montgomery has played in several bands since the late 1970s, most notably the Pin Group, Dadamah, Dissolve and Hash Jar Tempo. He has released solo albums on labels including Kranky and Drunken Fish, as well as collaborations with artists like Flying Saucer Attack and Grouper. Music critic Brett Abrahamsen opined that "in a just and fair world... books would be written about Montgomery's greatness."

== Biography ==
=== Early life ===
Montgomery was born in 1959 in London, England, and moved with his family to Cologne in Germany where he lived until the age of four. His father was German and his mother was from the UK. As his mother worked for the British Forces Broadcasting Service, Montgomery was exposed mostly to the pop music of the United Kingdom and United States rather than the music of Germany. In the mid-1960s he moved with his mother to Christchurch, New Zealand.

=== Early career ===
In 1980, he formed the Pin Group with bass player Ross Humphries and drummer Peter Stapleton. The group debuted with the single "Ambivalence" in 1981, the first release on newly founded label Flying Nun Records (released a week before the Clean's "Tally Ho!"). They recorded a second single with the same producer Arnold van Bussell, "Coat", before expanding their lineup and recording a five song EP at EMI Studios in Wellington. The group only performed a handful of times inside New Zealand before disbanding in March 1982, with Montgomery departing for England soon after. The Pin Group Go to Town EP was released in the next month in May. Montgomery later returned to Christchurch and released a single and music video as part of The Shallows called "Suzanne Said" in 1985. Montgomery worked with Stapleton again in experimental rock band Dadamah, formed in 1990.

=== Solo career ===
Montgomery had been composing and recording acoustic work since 1982, much of which he would integrate into his 1990s work. Although he enjoys collaborating with other artists, Montgomery is mostly drawn to working alone, which he attributes to growing up as an only child. He travelled through America from 1994 to 1995 after his wife Jo died in 1992. He spent time in New York in a sub-let apartment writing music by himself on a four-track recorder, where he recorded Scenes from the South Island, Temple IV, and some singles.

Montgomery described Scenes from the South Island as “about being away from your home country. I’ve never tired of the imagery that generated the album, and those landscapes are still places I go to, physically or in my mind. Those visions of space and atmosphere – the absence of busy, human life – populate a lot of what I do. It’s regenerative, an existential thing.” Scenes from the South Island was released in 1995 on Drunken Fish, and Temple IV was released on Kranky in 1996.

=== Academic career ===
Montgomery completed a master's thesis titled "Thou shalt take into account the principles of the Treaty of Waitangi and/or consider Maori cultural, traditional, and spiritual values": implications for research management at Lincoln University in 1990.

== Discography ==
=== Albums ===
- Scenes from the South Island (1995, Drunken Fish)
- Temple IV (1996, Kranky)
- And Now the Rain Sounds Like Life Is Falling Down Through It (1998, Drunken Fish)
- The Allegory of Hearing (2000, Drunken Fish)
- Silver Wheel of Prayer (2001, VHF)
- Music from the Film Hey Badfinger (2012, Yellow Electric)
- RMHQ: Headquarters (2016, Grapefruit)
- Suffuse (2018, Grapefruit)
- Refuse (2018, Grapefruit)
- Island of Lost Souls (2021, Grapefruit)
- Rhymes of Chance (2021, Grapefruit)
- That Best Forgotten Work (2021, Grapefruit)
- Audiotherapy (2022, Grapefruit)
- Camera Melancholia (2022, Grapefruit)
- Broken Heart Surgery (2024, Discreet Music)
- Guitars Infernal (2026, Discreet Music)

=== Compilations ===
- 324 E. 13th Street #7 (Drunken Fish, 1999)
- Inroads: New and Collected Works (Rebis, 2007)
- 324 E. 13th Street #7 (Yellow Electric, 2014)

=== Collaborations ===
- with Kim Pieters and Peter Stapleton and Janine Stagg as Dadamah: This Is not a Dream (Majora, 1992 and Kranky, 1995)
- with Chris Heaphy as Dissolve: That That Is, Is (Not) (Kranky, 1995)
- with Chris Heaphy as Dissolve: Third Album for the Sun (Kranky, 1997)
- with Bardo Pond as Hash Jar Tempo: Well Oiled (Drunken Fish, 1997)
- with Bardo Pond as Hash Jar Tempo: Under Glass (Drunken Fish, 1999)
- with Flying Saucer Attack: Goodbye (VHF, 1996)
- with Chris Heaphy: True (Kranky, 1999)
- with Grouper: Roy Montgomery/Grouper (Root Strata, 2010)
- with Nick Guy: Torlesse Super Group (Rebis, 2011)
- with Emma Johnston: After Nietzsche (Aguirre Records, 2019)
- with Mary Lattimore: Goodbye, Hotel Arkada (Ghostly International, 2023), track 3: "Blender in a Blender"
- with Martha Skye Murphy: Nebular (AD93, 2026)
