= Healing Is a Miracle =

Studio album by Julianna Barwick
- Released: July 11, 2020
- Length: 33:30
- Label: Ninja Tune
- Producer: Julianna Barwick

Julianna Barwick chronology
Will (2016)	Healing Is a Miracle (2020)

Healing Is a Miracle is the fourth studio album by American musician Julianna Barwick. It was released on July 10, 2020 under Ninja Tune.

== Singles ==
On May 20, 2020, Barwick announced the release of her new album, along with the first single "Inspirit". The second single "In Light", which features Sigur Rós lead singer Jónsi, was released on June 18, 2020.

== Critical reception ==
Professional ratings
Aggregate scores
Source	Rating
Metacritic	79/100
Review scores
Source	Rating
AllMusic	4/5 stars
Beats Per Minute	70%
Exclaim!	8/10
The Line of Best Fit	7/10
Loud and Quiet	8/10
Mojo	3/5 stars
MusicOMH	4.5/5 stars
Pitchfork	8.3/10
Slant Magazine	3.5/5 stars
Uncut	8/10

Healing Is a Miracle was met with "generally favorable" reviews from critics. At Metacritic, which assigns a weighted average rating out of 100 to reviews from mainstream publications, this release received an average score of 79, based on 13 reviews.

=== Accolades ===
The album appeared in several best-albums-of-2020 yearend lists, including those published by Drowned in Sound, The Line of Best Fit, Crack Magazine, musicOMH, Paste, Gorilla vs. Bear, Our Culture, The Vinyl Factory, Uncut, Noisey.com, God Is in the TV, AllMusic and The New Yorker.

== Track listing ==
Track listing adapted from Tidal

All tracks are written by Julianna Barwick, unless noted

Healing Is a Miracle track listing
No.	Title	Music	Length
1.	"Inspirit"	Julianna Barwick	4:13
2.	"Oh, Memory" (featuring Mary Lattimore)	J. Barwick	3:47
3.	"Healing Is a Miracle"	J. Barwick	4:11
4.	"In Light" (featuring Jónsi)	J. Barwick; Jón Þór Birgisson	6:06
5.	"Safe"	J. Barwick	5:00
6.	"Flowers"	J. Barwick	2:27
7.	"Wishing Well"	J. Barwick	3:53
8.	"Nod" (featuring Nosaj Thing)	J. Barwick; Jason Chung	3:57
Total length:			33:30

== Personnel ==
- Julianna Barwick – vocals (all tracks), producer (all tracks)
- Mary Lattimore – vocals (track 2)
- Jónsi – vocals (track 4)
- Nosaj Thing – vocals (track 8)
- Heba Kadry – mixing & mastering (all tracks), engineer (all tracks)

== Charts ==
Chart performance for Healing Is a Miracle
Chart (2020)	Peak position
UK Album Downloads (OCC)	55
UK Independent Albums (OCC)	20
