= Lapsed (album) =

Studio album by Bardo Pond
- Released: October 21, 1997
- Studio: Cycle Sounds, Philadelphia, PA
- Genre: Space rock; psychedelic rock; noise rock; shoegaze; post-rock
- Length: 47:36
- Label: Matador Records
- Producer: Bardo Pond, J. Cox

Bardo Pond chronology
Amanita (1996)	Lapsed (1997)	Set and Setting (1999)

Professional ratings
Review scores
Source	Rating
Allmusic	4.5/5 stars
The Austin Chronicle	3/5 stars
The Boston Phoenix	3/4 stars
The Independent	3/5 stars

Lapsed was the third album by Bardo Pond. It was released on October 21, 1997, on Matador Records.

== Reception ==
Like its predecessors, Lapsed received positive reviews from critics upon its release. "The achievement of Lapsed" wrote Jason Ankeny for AllMusic, "is that for the first time, it's possible not merely to get lost in Bardo Pond's music, but to let it actually lead you somewhere as well -- certainly a trip well worth taking." Pearson Greer, reviewing the album for Opus, called it a "dirty album, and wonderfully so at that. Guitars are so thoroughly caked in distortion that Sabbath and the Valentines seem like they’ve been playing cotton gins all these years in comparison. Bardo Pond doesn’t just evoke heavy rock or shoegaze sensations though, they do something in between and much better." Chicago Reader's Bill Meyer was similarly positive, hailing the album as a "blazing return to earth. The group still works up open-ended, exploratory jams whose contours gradually coalesce out of a haze of thick, distorted tones generated by bassist Clint Takeda and brother guitarists John and Michael Gibbons. [...] But now these ethereal elements are tethered by riffs that recall the sludgy downer rock of early Dinosaur Jr and "Iron Man"-era Black Sabbath; and where drummer Joe Culver used to sound like he was lost in the morass, his pummeling, cymbal-heavy attack now pushes the rest of the band through it."

A mixed review came from Angela Lewis of the British newspaper The Independent, who wrote: "Bardo Pond are not exactly the artistes to spin when granny visits, being wilder than a herd of Nirvana wannabes on the rampage, but a strong sense of purpose underlies the broody noise-scapes of this 5-piece from Philadelphia." Similarly mixed, Christopher Hess - reviewing the album for The Austin Chronicle in the lead up to the band's performance at SXSW - noted that "Bardo Pond's brand of drug-rock, thick as a hot kettle full of snot, is more explorative than experimental. There aren't any shocking changes or mechanical innovations here, just a mesmerizingly lolling sea of dissonant sounds, trudging along around mid-tempo to a final exhausted end, [...] This is not rock of violent addiction or somber coming-down, it evokes more a constant state of mind: a perpetual buzz that makes everything just a bit fuzzy around the edges."

The readers of Brainwashed voted it one of the best albums of the year in its annual poll. British musician Alexander Tucker would later name the album as one of his favorites & an influence, noting that "[t]here is a strong emotional aspect to this band that a lot of other experimental rock acts lack."

== Track listing ==
1. "Tommy Gun Angel" - 5:15
2. "Pick My Brain" - 6:43
3. "Flux" - 9:07
4. "Anandamide" - 2:23
5. "Green Man" - 6:26
6. "Straw Dog" - 3:23
7. "Aldrin" - 14:19

== Personnel ==
- Isobel Sollenberger - Flute, Vocals
- Michael Gibbons - Guitar, Vocals
- John Gibbons - Guitar, Vocals
- Clint Takeda - Bass
- Joe Culver - Drums, Vocals
- J. Cox - Producer, Engineer
