= You Are What You Eat (disambiguation) =

You Are What You Eat is a British television programme produced during 2004–2006 and 2022–present.

You Are What You Eat may also refer to following:

- "You Are What You Eat", a proverbial phrase

== Art, entertainment and media ==
- You Are What You Eat: A Twin Experiment, a 2024 vegan documentary series
- You are What You Eat, 2001 film installation by Mina Shum
- You Are What You Eat (film), a 1968 American counterculture semi-documentary movie
- Jste to, co jíte (You Are What You Eat), Czech TV show by Prima televize
- You Are What You Eat, art project by Sarah DeRemer

== Music ==
- You Are What You Eat, 1994 album by Sack (band)
- "You Are What You Eat", track on 1998 album The Technology of Tears by Fred Frith
- "You Are What You Eat", track on 2003 Home (Keller Williams album)
- "You Are What You Eat", track on 2011 children's music album Radio Wayne by Wayne Brady
- "看見什麼吃什麼" ("You Are What You Eat"), track on 2009 Mandarin album Senses Around by Yoga Lin

== Other uses ==
- You Are What You Eat, 1940 health food book by Victor Lindlahr
- "You Are What You Eat", one of the 2005 Royal Institution Christmas Lectures

== See also ==
- Pajama Sam 3: You Are What You Eat from Your Head to Your Feet, a computer game
