= Chris Heaphy =

New Zealand painter (born 1965)

Chris Heaphy is a New Zealand artist who is based in Auckland. His work explores cultural issues with a greater focus on the relationship between Māori and Pākehā due to the artist's background.

Chris Heaphy, Maukatere, 2012, acrylic on canvas. Courtesy of the artist and Gow Langsford Gallery

== Early life and education ==
Chris Heaphy was born in 1965 and is of Ngāi Tahu and European descent. He graduated from the Ilam school of Fine Arts in Canterbury, New Zealand in 1991 where he studied towards a BFA. In 1998, Heaphy completed a MFA in painting at RMIT University in Melbourne, Australia.

Over the years, Heaphy was granted several awards and fellowships, including: the Te Waka Toi Grant (1993), the Olivia Spencer Bower Award (1995), the Research Grant Residency, the RMIT University (1998), the Creative New Zealand Grant (1999), and the Veuve Cliquot Ponsardin Residency, Champagne, France (2000–2001).

== Career ==
Although Heaphy remains concerned with cultural heritage and history, his style has changed over time. Whereas his earlier compositions are subdued in tones, his later work confronts the viewer to vibrant colours. Heaphy's compositions are complex. He introduces an array of motifs drawn from Māori and European iconography demonstrating his interest in cross-cultural exchanges as well as referring to his personal history.

His installation After the Big Bang (2003) formed the bridge between Heaphy's previous body of works and his more recent works included in his first solo exhibition Sea of Tranquility at Gow Langsford Gallery that demonstrated Heaphy's new collage-style of paintings which he had started exploring back in 2003. Heaphy stated that his work After the Big Bang: "... developed like an inventory of the symbols [he] had used earlier, and it was a continuation of the earlier wall paintings, however it was more about drawing with shadows. The new paintings are a continuation of those ideas."

Heaphy is interested in the "inevitable change or slippage of meaning of the symbol." According to Heaphy, these symbols represent his identity.

Heaphy's bicultural heritage continues to inform his work as seen with his recent exhibition Maukatere at Gow Langsford Gallery. The works in this exhibition presents the viewer with a mixture of Māori and Pākehā symbols brought together in colourful compositions.

In addition to his work as a visual artist, Heaphy is also a noted musician, collaborating with fellow guitarist Roy Montgomery on the album 'True'.

== Selected exhibitions ==
Heaphy has gained national and international recognition through a variety of solo and group exhibitions across Australasia and Europe including:

Selected solo exhibitions (New Zealand unless otherwise stated)

2022: This Is Not The Same As Other Days, Milford Gallery, Queenstown

2009: Gallery Barry Keldoulis, Sydney, Australia

2009: Jonathan smart Gallery, Christchurch

2008: Daisy in my lazy eye, Plum Blossoms Gallery, Hong Kong

2008: Sea of Tranquility, Gow Langsford Gallery, Auckland

2007: The End of Nothing, Jonathan Smart Gallery, Christchurch

2005: Stereo, Michael Lett, Auckland

2005: After the Big Bang, Jonathan Smart Gallery, Christchurch

2004: Michael Lett, Auckland

2004: Stereo, Jonathan Smart Gallery, Christchurch

2003: Stereo, Michael Lett, Auckland

2002: Wonder works, Jonathan Smart Gallery, Christchurch

2001: New Works, Cite Gallery, Paris, France

2000: Wonder Works, Jonathan Smart Gallery, Christchurch

Selected group exhibitions (New Zealand unless otherwise stated)

2008: Sacred XIV, Gow Langsford Gallery, Auckland

2007: Frieze Art Fair, London, UK and Marianne Boesky Gallery, New York City, USA

2006: Triple Candy, Jonathan Smart Gallery, Christchurch

2006: Turn Off The Century, Pataka Gallery, Porirua

2006: Group Exhibition, Jonathan Smart Gallery, Christchurch

2005: Ka Kino To Pounamu He Pounamu Onamata, Auckland Art Gallery, Auckland

2005: Contexts: Being Bicultural in Contemporary Art, Hawke’s Bay Cultural Trust, Napier

2005: Michael Lett, Auckland

2004: Michael Lett Gallery stand, Melbourne Art Fair, Melbourne, Australia

2003: Changing times in painting, Conny Dietzschold Gallery, Sydney, Australia

2003: Slow Light, Curated by Wystan Curnow, Gus Fisher Gallery, University of Auckland, Auckland

2001: Painted Spaces, Australia Centre for Contemporary Art, Melbourne, Australia

2001: Parihaka, City Gallery, Wellington

2001: Accents Australians, Adamski Gallery, Paris, France

2001: Painted spaces, Auckland City Art Gallery, New Gallery, Auckland

== Selected bibliography ==
- Cross, David. 'A walk along the Fault line: The art of Chris Heaphy' in Art New Zealand No. 89. 1998
- ____________. Home and Away: Contemporary Australian and New Zealand art from the Chartwell Collection (Ed. William McAloon), 50, Auckland Art Gallery, 1999
- Heaphy, Chris and McKay, Bill. Chris Heaphy: Walk this way, Manawatu Art Gallery, Palmerston North, 1997
- Herrick, Linda, ‘ Paring back to essentials’ The New Zealand Herald, B7, Wednesday, 28 July 2004
- McNamara, T.J. ‘ Best Bets For Punters’, The New Zealand Herald, B6, Wednesday, 11 August 2004
- McNamara T.J. ‘Peephole to Infinity’, The New Zealand Herald.B6, Wednesday, 20 August 2003
- Smith, Allan. A Very Peculiar Practice: Aspects of Recent New Zealand Painting, City Gallery, Wellington, 1995
- Szekely, Chris (ED.). Korurangi: New Maori art, Auckland Art Gallery, 1996
- Thomas, David, Changing Times in Painting, Conny Dietzschold Gallery, 2003
