= Plagal Grind (EP) =

Plagal Grind EP

EP by Plagal Grind
- Released: 1990
- Studio: Fish Street Studios
- Label: Xpressway Records

Plagal Grind is a 12" EP by New Zealand band Plagal Grind, released in 1990. Containing members of This Kind of Punishment and The 3Ds, along with Alastair Galbraith, the band was considered a supergroup.

== Production ==
The EP was recorded at Fish Street Studios, in Dunedin, New Zealand.

== Critical reception ==
Trouser Press called the EP "one of the high-water marks for New Zealand rock," writing that it "ups the sonic ante with richly textured electric guitars and loads of reverb, resulting in a shimmering, mystical sound perfectly suited to [Alastair] Galbraith-penned songs like 'Yes Jazz Cactus', 'Marquesite Lace' and the majestic 'Receivership'."

== Track listing ==
Side A

1. "Vincent"
2. "Midnight Blue Vision"
3. "Receivership"
4. "Yes Jazz Cactus"

Side B

1. "Marquesite Lace"
2. "Starless Road"
3. "Blackout"

== Personnel ==
- Robbie Muir (bass)
- Peter Jefferies (drums)
- Alastair Galbraith (guitar, vocals)
- David Mitchell (guitar)
