= Andrew Kenny =

American singer-songwriter

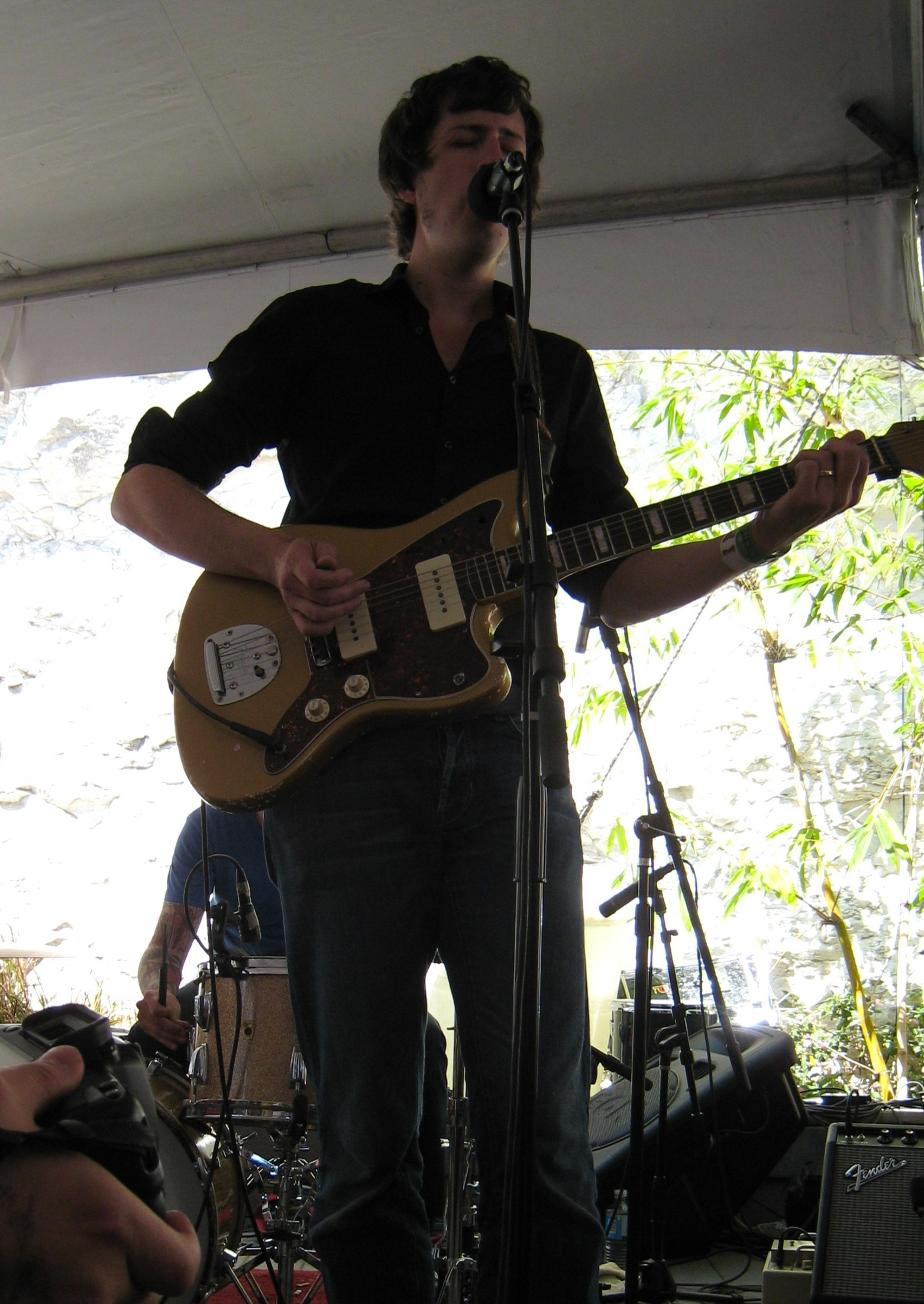
- Andrew Kenny in 2009

Background information
- Born: Andrew Kenny; Austin, Texas, U.S.
- Genres: Indie rock; lo-fi; slowcore; post-rock; indietronica; pop rock
- Occupation: Musician
- Instruments: Guitar; vocals; organ; electric piano; synthesizers; digital audio workstation
- Years active: 1989–present
- Member of: The American Analog Set
- Formerly of: The Wooden Birds

Andrew Kenny is an American singer-songwriter and multi-instrumentalist. He is best known as the frontman for the indie rock band The American Analog Set, which he founded in 1995, and as the main singer-songwriter of The Wooden Birds, an Austin-based indie rock band that initially began as a side project of his in 2008. He has also performed as a guest artist with other various musical acts throughout his career, including The Album Leaf, Her Space Holiday, Styrofoam, and Arthur & Yu.

In 2003, he released a split EP in the Home Series (Vol. V) with Benjamin Gibbard. In 2005, he contributed towards Broken Social Scene's 2005 self-titled album. Kenny toured briefly with Broken Social Scene in 2007 and with Ola Podrida in 2008, before moving back home to Austin to work on his own recordings.

In 2008, Kenny wrote and performed the entire score for the short film Pickup and Return, which was written and directed by award-winning writer/director Alex R. Johnson. In 2014, Kenny scored a second Johnson film, Two Step, which premiered later that year at the SXSW Film Festival.

== Discography ==
=== Solo ===
- Home Volume V with Ben Gibbard (2003)

=== The American Analog Set ===
- The Fun of Watching Fireworks (1996)
- From Our Living Room to Yours (1997)
- The Golden Band (1999)
- Know by Heart (2001)
- Promise of Love (2003)
- Set Free (2005)
- For Forever (2023)

=== The Wooden Birds ===
- Magnolia (2009)
- Montague Street EP (2010)
- Two Matchsticks (2011)
