= Alastair Galbraith =

New Zealand musician

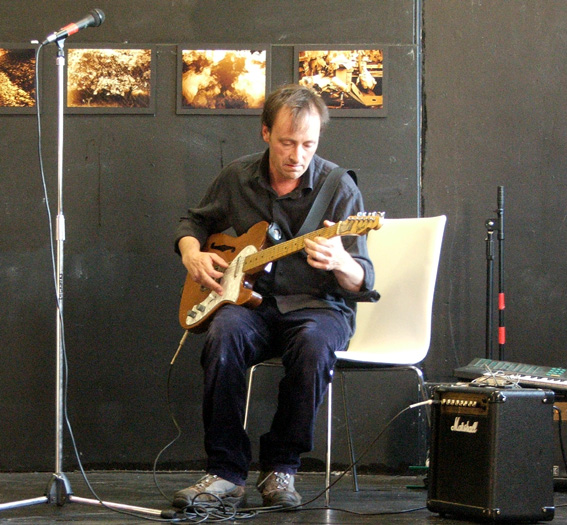
Alastair Galbraith, photographed in Dunedin in 2011.

Alastair Galbraith (born 1965) is a New Zealand musician and sound artist from Dunedin.

== Career ==
Galbraith's first band was The Rip, which he formed with Robbie Muir, and Mathew Ransome and later Jeff Harford (of Bored Games). They released two EPs on the Flying Nun label. Later he formed Plagal Grind, with Robbie Muir, Jono Lonie, David Mitchell (of Goblin Mix and The 3Ds) and Peter Jefferies (of This Kind Of Punishment and Nocturnal Projections).

Galbraith's solo career has included numerous early cassettes and 7"s on Bruce Russell's (The Dead C) Xpressway label, as well as albums on labels such as Siltbreeze, Emperor Jones, Time Lag, Feel Good All Over and Table of the Elements. He has also recorded ten albums with Bruce Russell under the name A Handful of Dust. During the 1990s, Galbraith frequently collaborated with the Mountain Goats, including co-releasing the 1995 joint EP Orange Raja, Blood Royal (with the Mountain Goats) and contributing violin and string arrangements to the Mountain Goats 1997 album Full Force Galesburg. In 1999, he began a collaboration with Matt De Gennaro when the two toured New Zealand Public Art Galleries converting them into giant soundboxes by stroking tensioned wires fixed to the buildings' structural supports. In 2002, he designed and built a glass-tube fire organ, during an arts residency at the Sarjeant Gallery's Tylee Cottage Residency in Whanganui. His subsequent album Orb includes the track 'Tylee Cottage' and a photograph of the fire organ in Whanganui's Durie Hill Elevator tunnel.

In 2006, he released Waves and Particles a collaboration with Maxine Funke (The Snares) and Mike Dooley (The Enemy, Toy Love, Snapper) as The Hundred Dollar Band. There was also the release of Long Wires in Dark Museums, Vol. 2 and the reissue of his early albums Morse/Gaudylight and Talisman by U.S. label Table of the Elements. Later that year he was awarded an Arts Foundation of New Zealand Laureate Award and released Belsayer Time, a collaboration with Richard Youngs and Alex Neilson. In 2007, Galbraith built a treadle-powered glass harmonium and released orb a solo album on his own Nextbestway label.

== Discography ==
The Rip:

- 1984 – A Timeless Peace EP (NZ Flying Nun Records)
- 1987 – Stormed Port EP (NZ Flying Nun Records)

Plagal Grind:

- 1990 – Plagal Grind EP (NZ Xpressway)

Solo:

Long Playing & Cassette

- 1987 – Hurry on Down cassette (Xpressway)
- 1992 – Morse (Siltbreeze)
- 1995 – Talisman (NZ, Next Best Way)
- 1998 – Mirrorwork (Emperor Jones)
- 2000 – Cry (Emperor Jones)
- 2007 – Orb (Next Best Way)
- 2010 – Mass (Siltbreeze) (with Amiel Balester, Michael Kohler and David Kilgour)

Singles & EPs

- 1989 – Timebomb – 7" with Graeme Jefferies – Xpressway – X/WAY 10
- 1991 – Gaudylight – EP 7" – Siltbreeze – SB07
- 1994 – Cluster – EP 7" – Ger. Raffmond – RAFF 006-7
- 1994 – Intro Version – EP 7" – Roof Bolt – RB001
- 1995 – Orange Raja, Blood Royal (with the Mountain Goats) – 7" – Walt Records – Walt 005
- 1995 – Tae Keening – EP 77" with Demarnia Lloyd – Roof Bolt – RB003
- 1996 – Split EP with Minimum Chips – 7" – Varispeed – VS02
- 1997 – Rivulets – EP 7" – Camera Obscura – CAM 004S
- 1998 – Wire Music – EP with Matt de Gennaro – Corpus Hermeticum – Hermes031
- 1998 – Black Forest – EP – with Robert Scott
- 1998 – Me & Gus – 7" – with Pip Proud – Emperor Jones – ej18
- 1999 – Orbital – 7" – Crawlspace Records – SPACE 007
- 1999 – Two Wires Violin Loop – EP – with Matt De Gennaro
- 2000 – Long Wires in Dark Museums, Vol. 1 – EP with Matt De Gennaro – Emperor Jones – ej39cd
- 2003 – Radiant (with Constantine Karlis) (Emperor Jones)
- 2006 – Long Wires in Dark Museums, Vol. 2 – EP with Matt De Gennaro – Xeric – XER-CD-103
- 2006 – Belsayer Time EP with Richard Youngs and Alex Neilson – Time-Lag – Time-Lag 034
- 2010 – Endless Black – EP – self-released
- 2010 – Dances for the Blind Owl – EP – La Station Radar – fake tape serie #15
- 2011 – Untitled 1–3 – 7" – Split EP with William Tyler

Compilations

- 1993 – Seely Girn – Feel Good All Over – fgao #14

A Handful of Dust (with Bruce Russell and Peter Stapleton):

- 1993 – Concord LP (Twisted Village)
- 1994 – The Philosophick Mercury CD (Corpus Hermeticum) 1994 (reissued on CD by No Fun Productions, 2008)
- 1994 – The Eightness of Adam Qadmon TC (Corpus Hermeticum)
- 1994 – Musica Humana CD (Corpus Hermeticum)
- 1995 – From a Soundtrack to the Anabase of St.John Perse TC (Corpus Hermeticum) 1995 (reissued on LP by Bluesilver, 2000)
- 1996 – Now Gods, Stand Up For Bastards CD (Corpus Hermeticum) 1996 (reissued on CD by No Fun Productions, 2008)
- 1997 – Topology of a Phantom City TC (Corpus Hermeticum)
- 1997 – Spiritual Libertines CD (Crank Automotive)
- 1998 – Jerusalem, Street of Graves CD (Corpus Hermeticum)
- 2002 – For Patti Smith CD (FreewaySound)
- 2009 – Panegyric (Next Best Way)

The Hundred Dollar Band (with Maxine Funke and Mike Dooley):

- 2006 – Waves and Particles (Emperor Jones)

Pure speculation (with Jean-Jacques Palix and David Watson):

- 2013 – Pure speculation (La Station Radar - single sided LP)
