= Know by Heart =

Know By Heart

Studio album by the American Analog Set
- Released: September 4, 2001
- Genre: Indie rock
- Length: 41:01
- Label: Tiger Style Records
- Producer: The American Analog Set

The American Analog Set chronology
The Golden Band (1999)	Know By Heart (2001)	Promise of Love (2003)

Professional ratings
Review scores
Source	Rating
AllMusic	4.0/5 stars
Pitchfork	(8.0/10.0)

Know by Heart is the fourth studio album by the American Analog Set. It was released on September 4, 2001, and was their first album on Tiger Style Records. The song "The Postman" contains vocals by guest Ben Gibbard of Death Cab for Cutie and the Postal Service. Gibbard later covered the song "Choir Vandals" on Home, Vol. 5, a split EP with the American Analog Set's own Andrew Kenny. Death Cab for Cutie also covered "Aaron and Maria" on Save Stereogum: An '00s Covers Comp in 2020. "Gone To Earth" first appeared on AmAnSet's 1996 album The Fun of Watching Fireworks. "Aaron & Maria" was included in an issue of CMJ New Music Monthly in 2002.

In 2009, "Gone To Earth' was used in the film The Time Traveler's Wife.

== Track listing ==
No.	Title	Length
1.	"Punk As Fuck"	4:09
2.	"The Only One"	2:15
3.	"Like Foxes Through Fences"	3:37
4.	"The Postman"	2:59
5.	"Choir Vandals"	3:01
6.	"Gone To Earth"	3:13
7.	"Million Young"	3:27
8.	"Kindness Of Strangers"	3:26
9.	"Know By Heart"	2:53
10.	"Slow Company"	3:00
11.	"Aaron & Maria"	3:10
12.	"We're Computerizing And We Just Don't Need You Anymore"	5:51
