= Another Year =

Another Year may refer to:

== Film and television ==
- Another Year (film), a 2010 British film by Mike Leigh
- "Another Year" (Upstairs, Downstairs), a 1974 TV episode

== Music ==
- Another Year (Leo Sayer album) or the title song, 1975
- Another Year (Nocturnal Projections album), 1982
- Another Year, an album by Taken by Trees, 2022
- "Another Year", a song by Animals as Leaders from The Joy of Motion, 2014
- "Another Year", a song by Candee Jay, 2004
- "Another Year: A Short History of Almost Something", a song by Amanda Palmer from Who Killed Amanda Palmer, 2008
