= Substatic =

Studio album by Peter Jefferies
- Released: September 29, 1998
- Genre: Post-rock
- Length: 40:00
- Label: Emperor Jones
- Producer: Michael Hill

Peter Jefferies chronology
Elevator Madness (1996)	Substatic (1998)	Closed Circuit (2001)

Substatic is the fourth solo album by New Zealand composer Peter Jefferies, released on September 29, 1998 through Emperor Jones. One of his most musically ambitious and emotionally complex efforts, it marks Jefferies' return to the completely instrumental format he had previously explored on his 1987 album At Swim 2 Birds.

== Composition ==
Substatic is known to be one of Jefferies' most experimental and musically adventurous recordings. The album comprises five pieces of music, including a lengthy seventeen-minute suite titled "Three Movements". The compositions are based around repetitious rhythms created by Jefferies' pianodrum, a combination of a keyboard and the snare and bass drum sections of a drum set, and are partially improvised.

The use of sampling is prominently used as part of the composition of Substatic. The piece "Index" includes sampled vocals of Jean Smith of Mecca Normal, taken from a 1995 live performance. "Damage" features audience noise which was recorded by Bruce Russell during a live performance. A digeridoo played by Alicia Aaparros Duran can be heard on the album's final track, "Three Movements".

== Reception ==
Professional ratings
Review scores
Source	Rating
Allmusic	3/5 stars

Joe Garden of The A.V. Club was also enthusiastic in his review of the album, saying that the music covers "a wide breadth of emotions" and is "highly charged, mostly toward the negative end of the emotional spectrum." Ned Raggett of allmusic gave it three out of five stars and called it a "striking, varied album" with "intentionally and beautifully murky production."

== Track listing ==
All music is composed by Peter Jefferies, except "Three Movements" co-written by Michael Hill and Anita Galitis-Anker

No.	Title	Length
1.	"Index"	7:36
2.	"Signal"	6:37
3.	"Damage"	5:50
4.	"Kitty Loop"	3:51
5.	"Three Movements"	16:06

== Personnel ==
- Anita Galitis-Anker – gong on "Index", bells on "Damage", flute and synthesizer on "Three Movements"
- Michael Hill – production, bass guitar on "Index", "Kitty Loop" and "Three Movements", acoustic guitar on "Index" and "Three Movements", electric guitar on "Three Movements"
- Peter Jefferies – electric piano, grand piano, keyboards, drums, electric guitar, bass guitar
