= The Cakekitchen =

New Zealand band

The Cakekitchen was a band from New Zealand featuring Graeme Jefferies (formerly of Nocturnal Projections and This Kind of Punishment). Jefferies formed the group in 1991 and the first lineup also included Robert Key and Rachael King. The band later became a project in which Jefferies plays most instruments alongside various sidemen including Keith McLean, Huw Dainow, and Jean-Yves Douet.

== Discography ==
- Time Flowing Backwards (1991)
- World of Sand (1991)
- Far from the Sun (1993)
- Bald Old Bear EP (1995)
- Stompin' Thru the Boneyard (1995)
- Everything's Going to Work Out Just Fine (1996)
- The Devil and the Deep Blue Sea (1996)
- Talkin to Me in My Sleep (1998)
- How Can You Be So Blind? (2003)
- Put Your Foot Inside the Door (2005)
- Everything's Driving You Crazy Cos You Just Can't Get What You Want (2006)
- Stories for Late at Night (2007)
- Kangaroos in My Top Paddock (2011)
- Calm Before the Storm (2012)
- Trouble Again in This Town (2020)
