= Home Volume V =

Home, Vol. 5: Andrew Kenny & Benjamin Gibbard

EP by Andrew Kenny & Benjamin Gibbard
- Released: May 12, 2003
- Genre: Indie rock
- Length: 19:20
- Label: Post-Parlo

Home, Vol. 5 is a split album released by Post-Parlo Records, the fifth volume in the Home series of short split albums featuring two artists. Vol. 5 features Benjamin Gibbard (Death Cab for Cutie, The Postal Service), and Andrew Kenny (The American Analog Set, The Wooden Birds), with the last song in each set being a cover of the other performer's respective band.

== Track listing ==
Tracks 1–4 performed by Benjamin Gibbard, tracks 5–8 performed by Andrew Kenny.

1. "You Remind Me of Home" (2:16)
2. "Carolina" (2:25)
3. "Farmer Chords" (2:26)
4. "Choir Vandals" (The American Analog Set cover) (2:34)
5. "Hometown Fantasy" (2:16)
6. "Secrets of the Heart" (2:25)
7. "Church Mouse in the Church House" (2:26)
8. "Line of Best Fit" (Death Cab for Cutie cover) (5:03)
