= Strange News =

Strange News may refer to:

- Apology of Pierce Penniless; or. Strange News of the Intercepting Certain Letters, (1592), by Thomas Nashe
- Strange News from Another Star, a collection of eight short stories
- Strange News from the Angels, a New Zealand album
