= Morse (album) =

Studio album by Alastair Galbraith
- Released: 1993
- Genre: Indie rock
- Label: Siltbreeze Records

Alastair Galbraith chronology
Hurry On Down (1987)	Morse (1993)	Talisman (1995)

Professional ratings
Review scores
Source	Rating
AllMusic	4/5 stars
The Austin Chronicle	3.5/4 stars

Morse is an album by the New Zealand musician Alastair Galbraith, released in 1993.

== Critical reception ==
AllMusic wrote that "there's as much gentle sing-song as there is experimental exploration, often at the same time." Trouser Press called it a "superb" anthology, and noted that it is a "tad stronger on a cut-by-cut basis" than the Seely Girn compilation.

Miami New Times deemed it "his finest album," calling it "a dark, haunting masterpiece, full of drama and pathos -- the product of a songwriting vision not unlike the lysergically bent expoundings of Syd Barrett." Reviewing the Morse and Gaudylight reissue, The Austin Chronicle wrote: "Detuned, layered guitars and funny noises define these records, which are as creepy as they are beautiful, paying homage to the ghostly aesthetic of Cale and Eno."

== Track listing ==
1. "Screaming E"
2. "Time Please"
3. "Marcasite Lace"
4. "Fall"
5. "More Then Magnetic"
6. "Hawks"
7. "Andalucia"
8. "Ivy Bound"
9. "My Bottom Line"
10. "Bone Idle"
11. "Semaphore"
12. "Portrait"
13. "Lit"
14. "Huxley"
15. "Vincent"
16. "R.D.S."
17. "Stone"

== Personnel ==
- Alastair Galbraith
- Peter Jefferies
- David Mitchell
