= Hellzapoppin' =

Hellzapoppin' can refer to:

- Hellzapoppin (musical), a 1938 musical
- Hellzapoppin' (film), a 1941 film
- Hellzapoppin, a one-shot 1972 television variety show
- Hellzapoppin' (album), a 1992 album by New Zealand band The 3Ds
