= Closed Circuit (album) =

Studio album by Peter Jefferies
- Released: October 23, 2001
- Genre: Post-punk
- Length: 36:52
- Label: Emperor Jones
- Producer: Peter Jefferies

Peter Jefferies chronology
Substatic (1998)	Closed Circuit (2001)

Professional ratings
Review scores
Source	Rating
Allmusic	2.5/5 stars

Closed Circuit is the sixth and final album by New Zealand composer Peter Jefferies, released on October 23, 2001 through Emperor Jones.

== Track listing ==
All tracks are written by Peter Jefferies

No.	Title	Length
1.	"Time and the Singular Man"	0:37
2.	"Crocodile"	2:58
3.	"Whatever You Want"	2:42
4.	"Closed Circuit"	3:35
5.	"Line in Tail Out"	0:21
6.	"Age for the Innocent"	2:49
7.	"Dryest Month in 100 Years"	4:30
8.	"Coming Home With You"	4:01
9.	"Red Sky"	1:52
10.	"King in the Clown's New Clothes"	1:02
11.	"State of the Nation"	3:21
12.	"Won't Be Long"	1:10
13.	"Talkin' Bout Nuthin'"	3:18
14.	"Ghostwriter"	4:36

== Personnel ==
- Michael Hill – engineering
- Peter Jefferies – vocals, guitar, bass guitar, drums, percussion, piano, keyboards, production, engineering
- Chris Smith – guitar
- Lewis Boyes – guitar
- Mark Cass Stevens – guitar, acoustic guitar, bass guitar
- Jerry Tubb – mastering
