= Hard to Find =

Hard to Find may refer to:

- "Hard to Find", a song by The American Analog Set from their 2003 album Promise of Love
- "Hard to Find", a song by Codeine from the EP Barely Real
- "Hard to Find", a song by The National from their album Trouble Will Find Me
- "Hard to Find", a song by Skillet from their 2013 album Rise
