= Julian Temple Band =

New Zealand indie band

- Also known as: JTB, Julian Temple, Juju Crew
- Origin: Dunedin, New Zealand and Cayucos, California, US
- Genres: Indie, Surf rock, alternative rock, chamber pop, folk, blues
- Years active: 2004–present
- Labels: Oscillosonic Records
- Members: Alex Vaatstra; Paul Mclennan-Kissel; Julian Temple; Steve 'Seedy' Marshall; Andy Straight; Logan Hampton
- Past members: Matthew Brook; Scott Campbell; Paul McMillan; Richard Ley-Hamilton
- Website: http://www.juliantempleband.com/

Julian Temple Band is an Indie band from Dunedin, New Zealand, fronted by Californian/New Zealand singer-songwriter Julian Temple. They formed in February 2004 as a surf-rock inspired project after post-graduate work at the University of Otago. The band has independently recorded and released seven albums; In Sea (2006), Quiet Earth (2009), Balance Escapes (2010), Upsidedownbackwards (2012), Ceiling in the Sky (2015), Antarctica (2018), and Tunnels (2023).

Within a week of its release, Upsidedownbackwards debuted on the New Zealand Artists Albums Chart and quickly climbed to number 7 over five weeks. With their fifth album Ceiling in the Sky, the band made their Official New Zealand Top 40 debut, peaking at number 15 and number 3 on the NZ Album Charts.

Over the course of the band's career they have toured extensively across New Zealand, Australia, and the United States, and received many accolades in their native New Zealand and abroad, including securing a finalist position in the 2013 and 2018 International Songwriting Competition in the AAA category plus a nomination in the Hollywood Music in Media Awards.

== History ==
=== Formation ===
Singer-songwriter Julian Temple was born into a diverse family of working musicians, with his mother, a Dixieland jazz pianist, and his father a classical lute player, giving him his first musical inspirations. Earliest memories include playing with toys and singing under his mother's antique grand piano as she vamped away to her original sheet music by the likes of Scott Joplin, Irving Berlin, Jelly Roll Morton, Rudy Vallee, Al Jolson and all the ragtime greats. The youngest of three, Temple taught himself the guitar at the age of 12 and immediately started writing his own material.

Fast forward to 2001 and Temple's family relocated to the small city of Dunedin in the South Island of New Zealand, Temple's father enrolled him in the undergraduate music programme at the historic University of Otago. Dunedin, New Zealand is known as a hub for small indie bands that gain large International followings (sometimes these acts are referred to under the sobriquet the Dunedin sound), such as: The Clean, The Verlaines, The Chills, and Chris Knox among others. It was here that Temple met fellow students, and soon to be band members Paul Mclennan-Kissel (known as PMK) and Matthew Brook and began jamming on new songs with the musicians. The group began playing shows around Dunedin, New Zealand with various acts, including reggae-rock act Left or Right, and then emergent dub band Six60. After the release of In Sea (2006), recorded at Albany Street Studios in Dunedin, the band garnered critical praise, NZ Musician writing: "The album is likely an accurate representation of their live sound, there are no complications, no layers of recorded guitars, just the band doing their thing". The album established the band's signature blend of genres and dynamics: "The music is sparse and simple with interesting interplay between the solid grooves of the bass, tidy playing on acoustic guitar and snappy drumming. This, with the breathy and poetic but not cheesy lyrics, push them into an acoustic rock, slightly jazzy, slightly bluesy kind of area".

=== Quiet Earth (2009) ===
Before an extensive tour of New Zealand in 2009, the band released their sophomore effort Quiet Earth (2009). Featuring fan-favourites Speedy, and Run Like Water, the touring of the album began to establish the band as a solid live act, with Temple himself being described as "Quite the showman with a rambunctious live show". Some reviews, while critical of some aspects of the album, praised the songwriting of the trio: "...because there's a lot of other good stuff going on: they are tight trio; Temple plays some superb guitar solos, fills and vamps; and he writes some strong songs".

=== Balance Escapes (2010) ===
After a lengthy tour, the band entered Paul Mclennan-Kissel's private studio named Sub Urb Studios, and quickly recorded a follow-up to 2009's Quiet Earth – the rock-inspired album Balance Escapes (2010). The record was the only full-length album to feature new bassist Scott Campbell, who had come to the attention of drummer McLennan-Kissel through their interactions in a jazz trio they both performed in called Entropy Trio. Campbell quickly took to touring with the band, even performing some of the dates on the Quiet Earth (2009) tour. The album featured a more rock-oriented sound, with some ambient features. Hit-song Debt Collector featured this new sound, while romping Black Holes For Eyes quickly became a live staple for the band.

=== Nowhere Fast (2011) ===
Having toured and recorded three records with the band, Julian returned to his native California on hiatus to work on new material, and later that year began work on a post-graduate diploma in Songwriting at the University of Otago. Nowhere Fast (2011), a solo effort, was released as part of this scholarship. The demo album featured B-sides from years with the band, and new material of a more introspective acoustic nature.

The solo album of Temple featured stripped down version of songs that would later be performed by the Julian Temple Band, including Be Okay ("Darkest Day"), and title track Nowhere Fast ("Upsidedownbackwards").

Julian began to become fascinated with the songwriting styles of Country music at this time, particularly the songs of Townes Van Zandt. The influence of this music on Julian's solo effort, and subsequent Julian Temple Band writing became apparent in follow-up albums.

=== Upsidedownbackwards (2013) ===
After bassist Scott Campbell moved to the capital of New Zealand, Wellington, to work in a museum, the now two-piece of Temple and Mclennan-Kissel recruited symphonic-orchestral musician Alex Vaatstra to play violin. After playing some notable gigs around the South Island, the group then rounded out the four-piece band with the addition of bassist Paul McMillan, a local Dunedin musician that had played for Males, and pop-band Two Cartoons. The band set about recording the next album in the artist-space known as The Attic, where drummer McLennan-Kissel was renting a space at the time. Over a week the new album was tracked, with overdubs being recorded at Mclennan-Kissel's house in Dunedin. The process was intensive, with the then relatively new bandmates recording well in to the next morning during some sessions. The result, Upsidedownbackwards, was the most successful Julian Temple Band record to date. Within a week of its release, Upsidedownbackwards debuted on the Official New Zealand Artists Albums Chart and quickly climbed to number 7 over five weeks.

=== Ceiling in the Sky (2015) ===
In 2014 the band returned for the first time in 8 years to Albany Street Studios, to record the follow-up album to their most successful record Upsidedownbackwards (2013). The highly anticipated record, titled Ceiling in the Sky, was produced by the band's bass player, Paul McMillan. Prolific recording engineer and Dunedin musician Michael Holland recorded and mixed the album, having worked with many of the band's contemporaries, including Left or Right. Legendary producer and sound engineer Tex Houston was enlisted to master the record, after Temple asked him to help with the record having heard his seminal work with bands The Clean, the 3ds, and David Kilgour. Producer and bassist Paul McMillan suggested ahead of its release that the band might move into electric and acoustic territory on the album: "It's definitely the most instruments we've ever had on anything. It's adding on the last record and building on the band that we have, which is nice". The album was released internationally on 17 October 2015. The album debuted on the Official New Zealand Top 40 Albums Charts at number 18, a week later re-entering at a new peak of number 15. It reached number 3 on the Official NZ Album Charts.

=== Antarctica (2018) ===
2018 saw the JTB return to the studio as a brand new six-piece, enlisting the talents of keyboardist Logan Hampton (Alizarin Lizard), bassist Steve 'Seedy' Marshall (Left Or Right), and electric guitarist Richard Ley-Hamilton (Males, Asta Rangu). Antarctica was recorded at Chick's Hotel, a historic building, in Port Chalmers, Dunedin, New Zealand by local studio engineer Tom Bell of Port Chalmers Recording Services.

=== Tunnels (2023) ===
Tunnels is JTB’s 7th studio album. The title track and basis of the album as a whole, according to Temple, is centred around the concept of finding new ways to communicate through music with people with intellectual disabilities, namely dementia and alzheimers and is dedicated to Temple’s mother, Rosamond Temple, a renowned ragtime pianist.
