= The Wooden Birds =

- Origin: Austin, Texas
- Genres: Indie rock
- Years active: 2008–2012
- Labels: Barsuk Records; Morr Music
- Past members: Andrew Kenny; Leslie Sisson; Sean Haskins; Matt Pond; Chris Hansen David Wingo; Chris Michaels; Jody Suarez; Michael Bell
- Website: thewoodenbirds.com

The Wooden Birds was a band from Austin, Texas (with members also in Brooklyn, NY), led by American Analog Set frontman, Andrew Kenny, formed in 2008. The band's final lineup, which Andrew Kenny introduced on stage as the "Hometown Fantasy Band", was Leslie Sisson (Western Keys, American Analog Set guest artist, Matt Pond PA) on lead guitar/vocals, and Sean Haskins on drums.

Their debut full-length album Magnolia was released on Barsuk Records (United States/Canada) and Morr Music (Europe) in 2009. Magnolia received attention from such publications as Pitchfork Media, Spin, and The Washington Post, with the track "Sugar" earning NPR's "Song of the Day." Since their record release, The Wooden Birds have played SXSW and toured Europe and the United States multiple times (Europe with Grand Archives, the U.S. with Other Lives, Great Lake Swimmers, The Clientele, Dan Mangan, and Broken Social Scene), totaling over 100 live performances in less than a year. They have been known to cover one or two American Analog Set songs in their live set.

In 2010, an EP of demo tracks recorded by Kenny in his home in Brooklyn Heights in 2008 titled Montague Street EP was released by Insound. The band's second album, Two Matchsticks, was released in June 2011.

Former members of the band include David Wingo (Ola Podrida, David Gordon Green film score composer) who sang backup on "Magnolia" along with Leslie Sisson, Michael Bell (Lymbyc Systym) on drums during SXSW, Magnolia co-producer Chris Michaels as a touring guitarist, and Jody Suarez as a touring percussionist. Andrew Kenny is also known for playing as a guest artist in The Album Leaf, Her Space Holiday, Styrofoam, Ola Podrida, Arthur & Yu, and Broken Social Scene.

== Discography ==
- Magnolia (2009)
- Montague Street EP (2010)
- Two Matchsticks (2011)

== Videography ==
- Hometown Fantasy (2009, directed by Leslie Sisson)
