= The Last Great Challenge in a Dull World =

Studio album by Peter Jefferies
- Released: 1990
- Recorded: September – October 1989 at Grey St, Port Chalmers, New Zealand
- Genre: Post-punk
- Length: 39:35 (cassette edition); 45:16 (CD edition)
- Label: Xpressway (original release); Ajax Records (1991 reissue)
- Producer: Peter Jefferies

Peter Jefferies chronology
At Swim 2 Birds (1987)	The Last Great Challenge in a Dull World (1990)	Electricity (1994)

Professional ratings
Review scores
Source	Rating
AllMusic	4.5/5 stars
Pitchfork Media	8.4/10

The Last Great Challenge in a Dull World is a 1990 album by New Zealand pianist Peter Jefferies. It was originally released on the Xpressway label, and reissued in 1992 and 1995 by Ajax Records. The reissue was remastered by Jefferies, and also contained tracks from the "Fate of the Human Carbine" 7", which he recorded with guitarist Robbie Muir. "The Fate of the Human Carbine" was later covered by American singer-songwriter Cat Power on her 1996 album What Would the Community Think. In 2013, the album was re-issued through De Stijl and included "The Fate of the Human Carbine"/"Catapult" 7-inch single with the vinyl edition.

== Accolades ==
Publication	Country	Accolade	Year	Rank
Ned Raggett	United States	The Top 136 Albums of the Nineties	1999	77

== Track listing ==
All tracks are written by Peter Jefferies

Side one
No.	Title	Length
1.	"Chain or Reaction"	3:20
2.	"Domestica"	2:18
3.	"On an Unknown Beach"	4:34
4.	"Guided Tour of a Well Known Street"	4:34
5.	"The House of Weariness"	3:53
6.	"Cold View"	2:08
7.	"Likewise"	2:40

Side two
No.	Title	Length
1.	"The Last Great Challenge in a Dull World"	3:16
2.	"While I've Been Waiting"	2:52
3.	"Neither Do I"	2:15
4.	"The Other Side of Reason"	5:59
5.	"Listening In"	3:10

CD Version
No.	Title	Length
1.	"Chain or Reaction"	3:20
2.	"Domestica"	2:18
3.	"On an Unknown Beach"	4:34
4.	"Guided Tour of a Well Known Street"	4:34
5.	"The House of Weariness"	3:53
6.	"Cold View"	2:08
7.	"Likewise"	2:40
8.	"The Fate of the Human Carbine"	3:15
9.	"Catapult"	2:12
10.	"The Last Great Challenge in a Dull World"	3:16
11.	"While I've Been Waiting"	2:52
12.	"Neither Do I"	2:15
13.	"The Other Side of Reason"	5:59
14.	"Listening In"	3:10

== Personnel ==
Musicians

- Kathy Bull – bass guitar on "Chain or Reaction"
- Peter Jefferies – vocals, piano, drums, percussion, production, mixing, mastering, engineering
- David Mitchell – guitar on "Chain or Reaction", "The Last Great Challenge in a Dull World" and "The Other Side of Reason"
- Michael Morley – backwards vocals on "The House of Weariness"
- Bruce Russell – guitar on "Guided Tour of a Well Known Street", "The House of Weariness" and "Cold View", vocals on "The House of Weariness"
- Robbie Yeats – drums on "Guided Tour of a Well Known Street"

Production and additional personnel

- Alastair Galbraith – mixing, guitar on "While I've Been Waiting", violin on "Listening In"
- Stephen Kilroy – mixing on "The Fate of the Human Carbine" and "Catapult"
- Barry McConnachie – mastering
- Robbie Muir – guitar and mixing on "The Fate of the Human Carbine" and "Catapult"
- Nigel Taylor – mixing, percussion on "Domestica", piano on "The House of Weariness"
