= New Drifters =

New Drifters may refer to:

- New Drifters, a band headed by Ray Lewis
- "New Drifters", the title of four songs by The American Analog Set from their 1999 album The Golden Band
  - "New Drifters I"
  - "New Drifters II"
  - "New Drifters III"
  - "New Drifters IV"
