= Fish Tales/Swarthy Songs for Swabs =

Compilation album by The 3Ds
- Released: 1991
- Recorded: 1990/91
- Label: Flying Nun Records
- Producer: Tex Houston/The 3Ds

The 3Ds chronology
Swarthy Songs for Swabs (1991)	Fish Tales/Swarthy Songs for Swabs (1991)	Hellzapoppin' (1992)

Professional ratings
Review scores
Source	Rating
AllMusic	3/5 stars

Fish Tales/Swarthy Songs for Swabs is a CD compilation album by New Zealand band the 3Ds, released in 1991. It has tracks from their first and second vinyl EPs, Fish Tales and Swarthy Songs for Swabs, as well as previously unreleased tracks.

It was the first recording from Stephen Kilroy's Fish Street Studios in Dunedin, and was recorded and mixed by Matthew Heine, Stephen Kilroy and The 3Ds. The 3Ds live sound engineer, Tex Houston, recorded and mixed Swarthy Songs for Swabs with the band.

== Track listing ==
1. "First Church"
2. "Dreams of Herge"
3. "Evil Kid"
4. "Fish Tails"
5. "Evocations of W.C. Fields"
6. "Mud Sacrifice"
7. "The Ball of Purple Cotton"
8. "Sing-song"
9. "Bunny"
10. "Ritual Tragick"
11. "Meluzina Man"
12. "Nimmo's Dream"
13. "Grimace"
14. "Hairs"
15. "One Eye Opened"
