= From Our Living Room to Yours =

Studio album by the American Analog Set
- Released: July 1, 1997
- Recorded: November 1996
- Genres: Indie rock, slowcore
- Length: 44:41
- Label: Emperor Jones
- Producer: The American Analog Set

The American Analog Set chronology
The Fun of Watching Fireworks (1996)	From Our Living Room to Yours (1997)	The Golden Band (1999)

Professional ratings
Review scores
Source	Rating
AllMusic	4.5/5 stars
Rolling Stone	3.5/5 stars

From Our Living Room to Yours is the second album by the American Analog Set, released in 1997 on Emperor Jones. It was recorded on analog equipment at the band's Austin, Texas, home.

== Critical reception ==
SF Weekly wrote that "on 'Where Have All the Good Boys Gone', the relative hush and use of empty space allow aural elements that would have been drowned out in a Great Wall of Marshall stacks to stand crisp and resolute." Rolling Stone called the album "an evocative blend of psychedelic melancholia."

The Chicago Tribune deemed it "a woefully overlooked gem," writing that the band "used a handful of keyboards, guitars and percussion to produce a dreamy, trippy tapestry of minimalist hooks." Nashville Scene labeled the songs' grooves "mesmerizing, like hearing all the odd juxtapositions of an old Yes song smoothed out and shaped into something gentle and calm." AllMusic gave the album a 4.5/5 and said the album "weaves a sonic tapestry of remarkable intricacy and texture" and "is truly a thing of beauty".

== Track listing ==
No.	Title	Length
1.	"Magnificent Seventies"	8:57
2.	"Using the Hope Diamond as a Doorstop"	2:45
3.	"Blue Chaise"	6:38
4.	"Where Have All the Good Boys Gone"	5:37
5.	"White House"	5:13
6.	"Two Way Diamond I"	4:08
7.	"Two Way Diamond II"	4:28
8.	"Don't Wake Me"	6:55
Total length:		44:41

== Personnel ==
Credits per the New Drifters box set:

- Andrew Kenny – electric guitar, organ, percussion, voice
- Jesse Lee – bass guitar
- Lisa Roschmann – electric piano, organ
- Mark Smith – drums, voice
