= Mirrorwork =

Mirrorwork may refer to:

- Shisha or mirrorwork, see Embroidery of India#Shisha or Mirrorwork (Gujarat, Haryana, Rajasthan)
- Mirrorwork (album), an album by Alastair Galbraith
