= Graeme Jefferies =

New Zealand musician

Graeme Jefferies is a musician from New Zealand.

In 1981 Graeme and his brother Peter Jefferies formed the post-punk band Nocturnal Projections. The band released a few records and cassettes, and played regularly around their hometown of New Plymouth, as well as Auckland.

After Nocturnal Projections disbanded in 1983, the brothers formed This Kind Of Punishment, and released three full-length albums, and an EP.

Following This Kind Of Punishment, Peter pursued a solo career, whilst Graeme formed new band The Cakekitchen.

== Discography ==
- Messages for the Cakekitchen (1988)
- Timebomb - Bravely, Bravely (1989, with Alastair Galbraith)
