= Elevator Madness =

Studio album by Peter Jefferies
- Released: October 22, 1996
- Recorded: January–June 1996 at Sounds Fine To Me and Profile Studios, Vancouver, British Columbia, Canada
- Genre: Post-punk
- Length: 39:54
- Label: Emperor Jones
- Producer: Jean Smith

Peter Jefferies chronology
Chorus of Interludes (1996)	Elevator Madness (1996)	Substatic (1998)

Professional ratings
Review scores
Source	Rating
Allmusic	3/5 stars
Alternative Press	4/5 stars

Elevator Madness is an album by New Zealand composer Peter Jefferies, released on October 22, 1996 through Emperor Jones.

== Track listing ==
All tracks are written by Peter Jefferies.

No.	Title	Length
1.	"Elevator Madness"	4:33
2.	"The Strange Case of Stuart Townsend"	7:09
3.	"World in a Blanket"	4:16
4.	"Loop"	2:18
5.	"Echoes"	3:44
6.	"28 Years"	1:59
7.	"Satellites and Sparks"	7:00
8.	"Shut Out"	5:07
9.	"Sunset"	3:48

== Personnel ==
- Mark Cohen – engineering
- Peter Jefferies – vocals, piano, keyboards, drums, guitar, bass guitar, cello
- Jean Smith – production, guitar on "Elevator Madness", "Loop" and "Shut Out", keyboards on "Sunset"
