= Electricity (album) =

Studio album by Peter Jefferies
- Released: 1994
- Recorded: May 1992 – February 1994 at Maitland St., Liverpool St., and Empire Tavern, Dunedin, New Zealand
- Genre: Post-punk
- Length: 50:48
- Label: Ajax Records
- Producer: Brendan Hoffman, Peter Jefferies

Peter Jefferies chronology
| The Last Great Challenge in a Dull World (1990) | Electricity (1994) | Chorus of Interludes (1996) |

Professional ratings
Review scores
| Source | Rating |
|---|---|
| AllMusic | 4.5/5 stars |

Electricity is a 1994 album by New Zealand pianist Peter Jefferies. It was released on the Ajax Records label. The album includes reworkings of previous Jefferies tracks "Wined Up" and "Crossover" (from a 1993 7" recorded with Stephen Kilroy).

It was reissued via Superior Viaduct in 2015.

== Critical reception ==
Trouser Press wrote that "Jefferies concentrates on the more melodious (if somber) end of things for most of the record, an approach that crystallizes beautifully on an album-ending cover of Barbara Manning’s 'Scissors.'”

== Track listing ==
All tracks are written by Peter Jefferies, except where noted

| No. | Title | Writer(s) | Length |
|---|---|---|---|
| 1. | "Wined Up" | Jefferies, Kilroy | 3:12 |
| 2. | "Quality" | | 1:48 |
| 3. | "Clear by Morning" | | 4:27 |
| 4. | "Dear Boss" | | 4:33 |
| 5. | "Scattered Logic" | | 2:35 |
| 6. | "Electricity" | | 3:13 |
| 7. | "By Small Degrees" | | 4:35 |
| 8. | "Next" | | 1:14 |
| 9. | "Snare" | Jefferies, Muir | 1:56 |
| 10. | "Don't Look Down" | | 2:22 |
| 11. | "Couldn't Write a Book" | | 2:05 |
| 12. | "Every Once in a While" | | 1:30 |
| 13. | "Just Nothing" | Jefferies, Russell | 6:42 |
| 14. | "Crossover" | Jefferies, Kilroy | 2:51 |
| 15. | "White Prole" | | 1:39 |
| 16. | "Brighten or Bleed" | | 1:55 |
| 17. | "Scissors" | Manning | 3:20 |

== Personnel ==
- Paul Cahill – guitar on "Crossover"
- Shayne Carter – guitar on "Wined Up" and "Electricity", bass guitar on "Electricity"
- John Harvey – sampler
- Brendan Hoffman – production, engineering
- Peter Jefferies – vocals, piano, keyboards, drums, guitar, bass guitar, cello, production, engineering
- Robbie Muir – guitar on "Snare"
- Bruce Russell – guitar on "Just Nothing"
