= The Golden Band =

Studio album by the American Analog Set
- Released: July 6, 1999
- Recorded: January–February 1999
- Genres: Indie rock, lo-fi
- Length: 40:16
- Label: Emperor Jones
- Producer: Andrew Kenny

The American Analog Set chronology
From Our Living Room to Yours (1997)	The Golden Band (1999)	Know by Heart (2001)

Professional ratings
Review scores
Source	Rating
AllMusic	4/5 stars
The Encyclopedia of Popular Music	3/5 stars

The Golden Band is the third studio album studio album by the American indie rock band the American Analog Set, released in 1999 on Emperor Jones Records.

== Critical reception ==
Exclaim! thought that "at last, the band has created melodies and bewitching atmospheres that enhance, rather than negatively emphasise, their deliberate lack of dynamics." The Chicago Tribune noted that the band was moving away from the influence of Stereolab and the Chills, and wrote that "they play brief, unhurried songs and delicate, vibraphone-textured instrumentals that flow dreamily into each other." Texas Monthly opined that "the group's careful silences and hypnotic guitar-vocal motifs could add up to nothing more than pleasing ambience, but the band transcends the surfaces."

AllMusic wrote that "the record insinuates itself on the strength of a subtly expanded emotional palette which lends a haunting new dimension to the group's fragile beauty."

== Track listing ==
All tracks are written by Andrew Kenny

No.	Title	Length
1.	"Weather Report"	2:53
2.	"Good Friend Is Always Around"	2:32
3.	"It's All About Us"	6:29
4.	"A Schoolboy's Charm"	4:22
5.	"The Wait"	3:09
6.	"New Drifters I"	2:00
7.	"New Drifters II"	3:13
8.	"New Drifters III"	3:41
9.	"New Drifters IV"	0:46
10.	"Golden Band"	3:00
11.	"I Must Soon Quit the Scene"	5:39
12.	"Will the Real Danny Radnor Please Stand?"	2:32

== Personnel ==
Credits per the New Drifters box set:

The American Analog Set

- Andrew Kenny – acoustic guitar, electric guitar, percussion, vibraphone, voice
- Jesse Lee – bass guitar, percussion
- Lisa Roschmann – electric piano, organ, piano
- Mark Smith – drums, percussion

Additional musician

- Leslie Sisson – cello on "Will the Real Danny Radnor Please Stand?"
