= The Fun of Watching Fireworks =

Studio album by the American Analog Set
- Released: August 20, 1996
- Recorded: 1995
- Studio: Legend House in Fort Worth, Texas
- Genres: Indie rock; slowcore; lo-fi; post-rock; dream pop
- Length: 44:01
- Label: Emperor Jones
- Producer: The American Analog Set

The American Analog Set chronology
The Fun of Watching Fireworks (1996)	From Our Living Room to Yours (1997)

Professional ratings
Review scores
Source	Rating
AllMusic	4.5/5 stars

The Fun of Watching Fireworks is the debut studio album by the American Analog Set. It was released on August 20, 1996, on Emperor Jones records. In 2024, the album was included in New Drifters, a 5xLP boxset released by archival label The Numero Group. In 2025, The Numero Group reissued the album as a stand-alone single LP.

== Track listing ==
No.	Title	Length
1.	"Diana Slowburner II"	5:23
2.	"On My Way"	9:51
3.	"Gone to Earth"	7:03
4.	"On the Run's Where I'm From"	6:16
5.	"Dim Stars (The Boy in My Arms)"	6:14
6.	"Trespassers in the Stereo Field"	1:22
7.	"Too Tired to Shine II"	6:05
8.	"It's Alright"	1:47

== Personnel ==
Credits per the New Drifters box set:

- Andrew Kenny – acoustic guitar, electric guitar, marimba, organ, percussion, voice
- Jesse Lee – bass guitar
- Lisa Roschmann – electric piano, flute, organ, voice
- Mark Smith – drums, percussion
