= Mirrorwork (album) =

Studio album by Alastair Galbraith
- Released: 1998
- Genre: Indie rock
- Label: Emperor Jones

Alastair Galbraith chronology
| Talisman (1995) | Mirrorwork (1998) | Cry (2000) |

Professional ratings
Review scores
| Source | Rating |
|---|---|
| AllMusic | 4/5 stars |

Mirrorwork is an album by the New Zealand musician Alastair Galbraith, released in 1998. It was released by Emperor Jones in the U.S.

== Critical reception ==
AllMusic wrote: "Where the joy of Mirrorwork comes in is how [Galbraith] works that combination to his own ends, coming up with some new, intriguing results. The combination of soft and clattering has been done before, for instance, but 'Ludd,' with prominent acoustic guitar in one speaker and various feedback growls and random noises in the other, is one of Galbraith's best balances between the two extremes."

== Track listing ==
Side A

1. "For Free"
2. "Doublet"
3. "Ludd"
4. "High & Fired"
5. "Sob"
6. "Rivulets"
7. "Thoar"
8. "Song To The Third"
9. "Filter"
10. "Ember"
11. "Blue Room"

Side B

1. "Surrender"
2. "Moth"
3. "This Hard"
4. "Star"
5. "Vinyl Curtain"
6. "Raining Here"
7. "Stealthy"
8. "Flickering Birds"
9. "Frostfish"
10. "Hospice"
11. "Navajo"
12. "Favourite Blue"
13. "Last Air"

== Personnel ==
- Alastair Galbraith
- Shayne Carter
- David Mitchell
