= Talisman (Alastair Galbraith album) =

Studio album by Alastair Galbraith
- Released: 1995
- Genre: Indie rock
- Label: Next Best Way

Alastair Galbraith chronology
Morse (1993)	Talisman (1995)	Mirrorwork (1998)

Professional ratings
Review scores
Source	Rating
AllMusic	3/5 stars

Talisman is an album by the New Zealand musician Alastair Galbraith, released in 1995.

== Critical reception ==
Trouser Press called the album "a meandering, scattershot affair that displays little evidence of [Galbraith's] former songwriting acumen."

== Track listing ==
1. "Talisman" - 01:15
2. "Yuhahi" - 01:46
3. "Carlos" - 01:22
4. "Xtra I" - 00:45
5. "Black Flame" - 03:47
6. "Waits" - 00:36
7. "Water In My Ears" - 00:57
8. "Anais" - 03:18
9. "Cemetery Ragga" - 02:07
10. "Welfare Child" - 01:35
11. "Mrs. Meggary" - 03:37
12. "I'm Rich" - 01:10
13. "P.D. Lyte" - 02:22
14. "Policemen On Ether" - 01:50
15. "Coast Road" - 01:11
16. "Allone" - 01:45
17. "Lucid Branches" - 02:05
18. "Strong Enough" - 01:54
19. "Coded" - 02:00
20. "Seamed" - 03:07
