= The Venus Trail =

Studio album by The 3Ds
- Released: 1993
- Label: Flying Nun Records

The 3Ds chronology
Beautiful Things EP (1993)	The Venus Trail (1993)	Caterwauling (1994)

Professional ratings
Review scores
Source	Rating
AllMusic	4/5 stars
Spin Alternative Record Guide	7/10

The Venus Trail is an album by the New Zealand band the 3Ds, released in 1993. The album was released by Merge Records in the United States.

== Production ==
The recording sessions took place at the Grand Masonic Lodge, in Dunedin, New Zealand.

== Critical reception ==
The New Zealand Herald called The Venus Trail "a more refined and accomplished album." Stylus Magazine called the album's first single, "Hey Seuss", "a fantastic scuzzed-up pop song of a track built around a simple descending guitar riff, but for all the sophistication of its recording, it still sound like it was done on Chris Knox’s four track." Trouser Press wrote that the album "can’t match Hellzapoppin’s amazing gusts of energy — not even with the angry, two-minute sock in the face 'Hey Seuss' — yet it attains nearly the same level of accomplishment in the expanded range of sounds." Spin wrote that "beautiful melodies fight to be recognized over the twin guitar delirium."

== Track listing ==
Side one

1. "Hey Seuss" – 2:22
2. "Philadelphia Rising" – 4:50
3. "Cash None" – 3:08
4. "The Golden Grove" – 2:45
5. "The Venus Trail" – 2:12
6. "Beautiful Things" – 3:32

Side two

1. "Man on the Verge of a Nervous Breakdown" – 4:07
2. "Jane Air" – 3:08
3. "The Young and the Restless" - 3:18
4. "Summer Stone" – 2:40
5. "Ice" – 6:05
6. "Spooky" – 4:54

== Personnel ==
- David Mitchell – guitar, vocals
- Denise Roughan – bass guitar, keyboards, vocals
- David Saunders – guitar, vocals
- Dominic Stones – drums
