= Anthonie Tonnon =

New Zealand musician

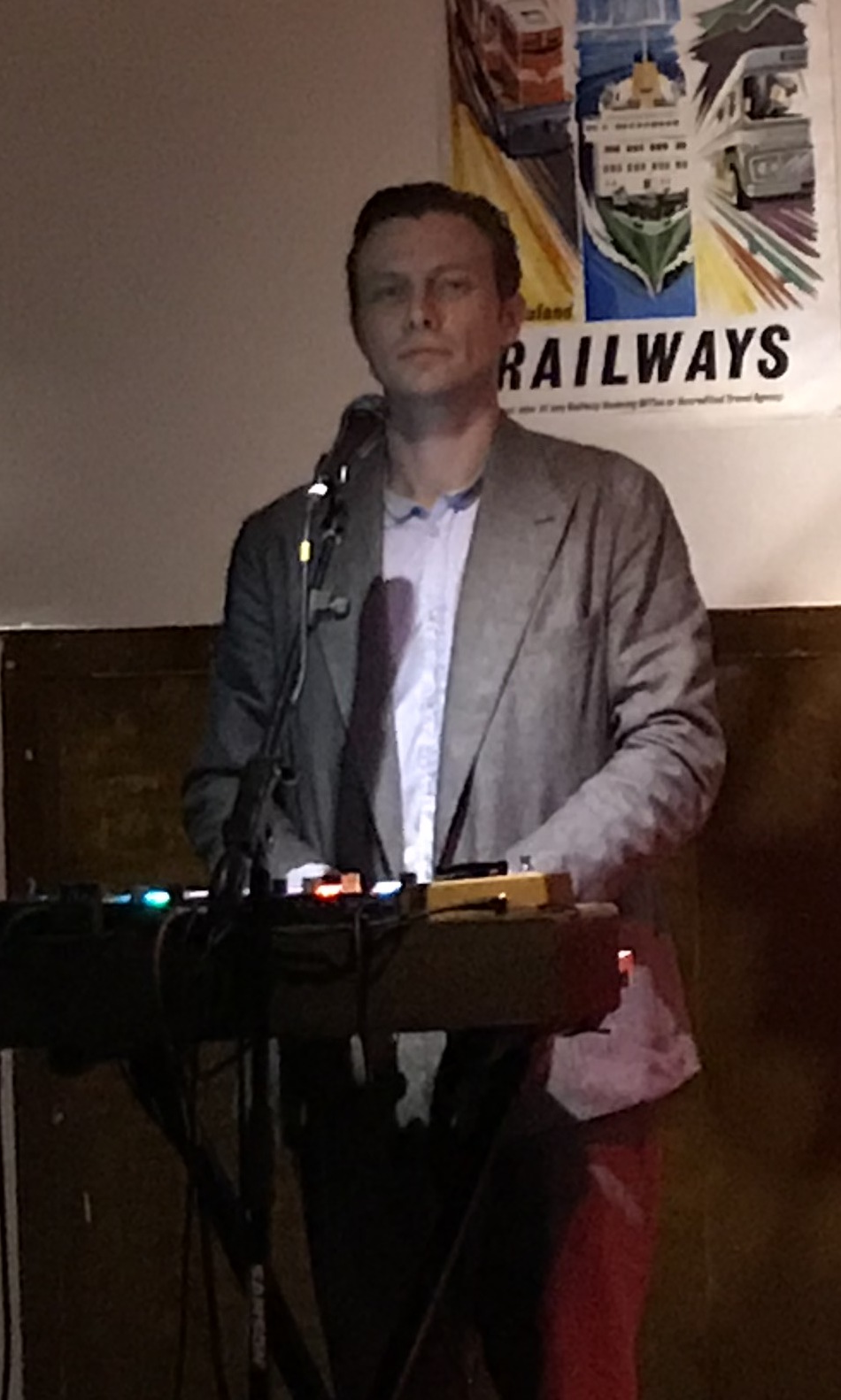
- Tonnon in 2019

Background information
- Born: 1989 (age 36–37); Tauranga, New Zealand
- Genres: Indie music; Alternative music
- Occupations: Singer; songwriter; public transport advocate; elevator operator
- Years active: 2010–present
- Labels: Canapé King Records, Misra Records, Wild Kindness, Slow Time Records
- Website: www.anthonietonnon.com

Anthonie Tonnon (born 1989) is a New Zealand songwriter, musician, public transport advocate and operator of Whanganui's historic Durie Hill Elevator.

== Biography ==
Tonnon grew up in Dunedin and studied music and history at the University of Otago.

The inspiration for some of Tonnon's works come from current affairs: "Water Underground" on irrigation on the Canterbury Plains; "Marion Bates Realty" on Auckland's gentrification; "Lockheed Bomber" about the Canberra air disaster; and his show Rail Land on car dependence.

His 2015 album Successor was a 2016 Taite Music Prize finalist. He won the 2022 Taite Music Prize for Leave Love Out of This.

In 2021 Tonnon took on the contract to operate the Durie Hill Elevator in Whanganui.

A minor planet 44527 Tonnon was named after Tonnon as a result of his Synthesized Universe, a show he developed in 2018 for the planetarium at the Otago Museum in Dunedin.

== Discography ==
=== Studio albums ===
Title	Album details	Peak chart positions	
Title	Album details	NZ	NZ Artist
Successor	Released: 6 March 2015; Label: Canapé King Records, Misra/Wild Kindness; Format: CD, LP, digital download, streaming	–	7
Leave Love Out of This	Released: 16 July 2021; Label: Slow Time Records, Misra Records; Format: CD, LP, digital download, streaming	9	2
"—" denotes a recording that did not chart.

=== Singles ===
Title	Year	Album
"Water Underground"	2015	Successor
"Two Free Hands"	2017	Leave Love Out of This
"Old Images"	2018	Leave Love Out of This
"Mataura Paper Mill"	2020	Leave Love Out of This
"Entertainment"	2021	Leave Love Out of This
"Leave Love Out of This"	2021	Leave Love Out of This
"Peacetime Orders"	2021	Leave Love Out of This
"Lockheed Bomber"	2022	Leave Love Out of This
