= Swarthy Songs for Swabs =

Swarthy Songs For Swabs

EP by The 3Ds
- Released: 1990
- Label: Flying Nun Records

The 3Ds chronology
Fish Tales (1990)	Swarthy Songs For Swabs (1990)	Fish Tales/Swarthy Songs for Swabs (1991)

Professional ratings
Review scores
Source	Rating
AllMusic	4/5 stars

Swarthy Songs for Swabs is a 12"-EP by New Zealand band the 3Ds, released in 1990.

== Track listing ==
1. "Sing-Song" – 2:19
2. "Bunny" – 1:52
3. "Ritual Tragick" – 3:15
4. "Meluzina Man" – 2:54
5. "Nimmo's Dream" – 2:41
6. "Grimace" – 2:03
