= Pip Proud =

Australian singer, poet, writer (1947–2010)

- Born: Phillip John Proud; 11 September 1947; Adelaide, South Australia, Australia
- Origin: Sydney, New South Wales, Australia
- Died: 4 March 2010 (aged 62)
- Genres: Pop
- Occupations: Singer-songwriter, poet, writer
- Instruments: Vocals, guitar
- Label: Phillips/Phonogram

Phillip John "Pip" Proud (11 September 1947 – 4 March 2010) was an Australian singer-songwriter, poet, novelist and dramatist whose idiosyncratic song-poems gained a cult following in Australia in the 1960s and around the world in the 1990s-2000s.

== Biography ==
Phillip John "Pip" Proud was born in Adelaide on 11 September 1947. He is the younger brother of artist Geoffrey Proud (1946–2022). The family lived in different parts of South Australia including the inner city suburb of Hindmarsh, where his parents were "middle class and so on, and so on." The family later moved to the Snowy Mountains. He recalled his childhood: "I was tremendously lonely as a child. I was slightly spastic, couldn't write properly, couldn't catch balls... I never understood why my peers rejected me. I had no close friends. I was a near-failure at English, and used to get someone else to do my poetry for me. But I matriculated, just to prove to my parents I could do it."

Proud worked as a radio repairer, electrician's apprentice, and started writing poetry, "it was mostly protest stuff, and I'm not proud of it." Geoffrey had moved to Sydney and Proud joined him there in the mid-1960s. Proud explained his style, "I tried to keep away from reading poetry so as not to be influenced. I have to write in my own way, with words you can taste. I didn't want to learn other people's tricks, but make my own tricks. I kept away from the moderns especially, yet I have come by myself to use a modern idiom."

Proud's unusual musical style was likened to Tom Rapp and Syd Barrett, though he was unfamiliar with the latter's work when he recorded his three albums of the late 1960s (which pre-dated Barrett's solo releases). The first album, De Da De Dum (Grendel, 1967) was home recorded and privately pressed as a limited edition of up to 50 copies (it was reissued in 2020). His girlfriend, Alison, assisted on cow bells. According to Kay Keavney of the Australian Women's Weekly, "The result was passing strange. Pip chanted his poems in his soft, unmelodious voice, to his own guitar music."

Proud was the subject of a 17-minute short film, De Da De Dum (Jan 1968), directed by Sydney film maker, Garry Shead, a member of the Ubu Films collective. In his book Ubu Films: Sydney Underground Movies 1965-1970 (1997) Peter Mudie described the film as an "experimental documentary" which "observes Pip and his constant companion Alison in a variety of settings which project Pip's attitudes to urban life. Slow, fast and single frame filming are used, and some images are drawn on and punctured. Pip sings his own songs on the sound track." One of his supporters in the late 1960s was the poet Michael Dransfield, who encouraged him to write novels.

Following interest generated by the film, he was signed to the Phillips/Phonogram label and his first commercial album Adreneline [sic] and Richard (1968) reprised most of the tracks from his earlier effort, re-recorded. Some tracks had a full band backing added without his involvement. Australian musicologist, Ian McFarlane has written that it "contained such sparse, idiosyncratic and evocative songs as 'De Da De Dum', 'Purple Boy Gang', 'Into Elizabeth's Eyes', 'An Old Servant' and 'Adreneline [sic] and Richard'."

The album "garnered positive reviews in Go-Set, and Proud made a few television appearances as well as doing a handful of live gigs." Proud described how he was treated by the media, "Mostly they sent me up." Keavney reported, "abruptly as the bubble blew up, it burst." A small number of concerts Proud put on were, Keavney wrote, "a disaster. 'I was nervous and the PA systems didn't work,' said Pip."

His second album, A Bird in the Engine, appeared in July 1969. Keavney felt "there was steel in young Pip... It was highly original and very much Pip Proud... And 'the literary people' began to take notice of Pip." Two poems were anthologised in a collection published by Sun Books, Australian Poetry Now through Dransfield's advocacy; Dransfield also created a publishing firm, Dransfield and Sladen, "to publish both his poetry and two of his novels, Miss Rose and The River, the Snake, the Tree, and the House." Although these books were written, they were not published. McFarlane summarised Proud's impact, "This shy singer/songwriter/poet was a true anomaly on the Australian 1960s pop scene. Proud sang his gentle pop songs in a quaint, quavering voice while strumming or tapping the strings of his (unamplified) electric guitar." He ceased working with the Philips label and did not release any further recordings until the mid-1990s.

Proud travelled to Britain in late 1969 to further his career. he told Keavney, that he intended to travel to the east, "Buddhism is a very gentle, unbinding religion. That's why I want to learn more about it. I might stay in a monastery for a year just to see." He returned to Australia in 1971. He "spent most of the 1970s writing poems, novels and plays." His novels are yet to be published, "although Sydney radio station Double J aired two adaptations of his plays Vlort Phlitson, Intergalactic Trouble Shooter and Don Coyote." In 1975 Proud contributed to a three-author poetry collection, Upon the Dancing, with Iain Ramage and Michael Ney. He lived in northern Tasmania for some years before relocating to northern New South Wales, eventually living in Tenterfield in the mid-1990s.

In 1994 New Zealand singer-guitarist, Alastair Galbraith, released a track, "Pip Proud", on his four-track extended play, Cluster. Proud was tracked down in 1995 by historian David Nichols leading to the re-release of his two Polydor LPs on CD via Nic Dalton's Half a Cow label as Eagle-Wise (1996). Nichols and Dalton also helped Pip record six new songs in 1996, two of which have been released to date.

Proud resumed recording new material to release more albums, primarily, for the Emperor Jones label. He described how, "I started recording again. I had to learn the guitar again. I recorded to a cassette player that was hooked up to the car to power it, then a petrol generator, then solar cells. I've released four or five albums on the Emperor Jones label and I'm looking forward to doing another, a call-and-response rap album."

During the 2000s Proud's health declined. In 2002 he had a stroke which left him blind and partially paralysed. He moved to a care facility in Healesville to be close to his two oldest sons, who were living in Melbourne. In 2006, he played two live shows, his first in over thirty years, in Melbourne. Proud died in March 2010, aged 62, from throat cancer. He was survived by five children and their two mothers.

== Discography ==
=== Albums ===
- De Da De Dum (1967) – Grendel (limited edition) (reissued by Half a Cow, 2019)
- Adreneline [sic] and Richard (1968) – Philips/Phonogram, International Polydor Production (LPHM-108)
- A Bird in the Engine (1969) – Philips/Phonogram, International Polydor Production
- Eagle-Wise (compilation, 1996) – Half a Cow (HAC45)
- One of These Days (compilation, 1998) – Emperor Jones (EJ21CD)
- Oncer (1999) – Emperor Jones (EJ27CD)
- A Yellow Flower (2001) – Emperor Jones (EJ37CD)
- Catch a Cherub (by Pip Proud and Tom Carter) (2002) – Emperor Jones (EJ50)
- A Fraying Space (compilation, 22 July 2014) – EM Records (EM1121CD)
