= Chorus of Interludes =

Compilation album by Peter Jefferies
- Released: 24 June 1996
- Genre: Post-punk
- Length: 34:37
- Label: Ajax Records
- Producer: Peter Jefferies

Peter Jefferies chronology
Electricity (1994)	Chorus of Interludes (1996)	Elevator Madness (1996)

Professional ratings
Review scores
Source	Rating
Allmusic	4/5 stars

Chorus of Interludes is a compilation album by New Zealand composer Peter Jefferies, released on 24 June 1996 through Ajax Records.

== Track listing ==
All tracks are written by Peter Jefferies

No.	Title	Length
1.	"Crossover"	3:10
2.	"Image of a Single"	4:40
3.	"Lassitude"	1:10
4.	"Don't Call Me, I'll Call You"	3:16
5.	"Guided Tour (Live)"	2:39
6.	"Swerve"	3:38
7.	"Wined Up"	3:17
8.	"Knocked Out or Thereabouts"	1:44
9.	"A Chorus of Interludes"	4:53
10.	"Spark Off a Wire"	2:12
11.	"Reaching an End"	4:08

== Personnel ==
- Peter Jefferies – vocals, piano, drums, cello, production
