= Stormed Port =

Stormed Port EP

EP by The Rip
- Released: 1987
- Label: Flying Nun Records – FN069

The Rip chronology
A Timeless Peace EP (1984)	Stormed Port EP (1987)

Alastair Galbraith chronology
A Timeless Peace EP (1984)	Stormed Port (1987)	Hurry on Down (1987)

Stormed Port is a 12" EP by New Zealand band The Rip, released in 1987.

== Track listing ==
Side A

1. River/Chasm
2. Starless Road
3. Stormed Port

Side B

1. Entropic Carol
2. Wrecked We Hymn

== Personnel ==
- Robbie Muir (bass)
- Jeff Harford (drum)
- Alastair Galbraith (guitar, vocals)
