= Maxine Funke =

New Zealand musician

Maxine Funke is a New Zealand singer-songwriter, based in Dunedin.

== Biography ==
Growing up in a musical family, her early bands included the Snares, the Hundred Dollar Band (with Alastair Galbraith) and the Beaters, before beginning her solo career with the full-length album Lace in 2008 and Felt (2014).

Her first two releases began to build an audience which led to significant media attention for her third album Silk in 2018 and her fourth, Seance in 2021. The Sydney Morning Herald featured Seance, writing that Funke "has for several years quietly gone about making exquisite, minimal music on a small scale, tucked away in New Zealand – yet has consistently attracted worldwide acclaim." Pitchfork praised the album, writing, "spare acoustic arrangements make deceptively simple containers for songs charged with memory and mysticism." Within New Zealand, Seance occasioned a review of her career from NZ Musician, noting forthcoming projects and how the Covid-19 isolation fed into her 2021 album.

A compilations of singles and out-takes, Pieces of Driftwood, was released to acclaim in 2022 both within New Zealand and internationally.

In April 2023, River Said was released with UK record label Disciples, who had released her previous compilation.

A nine-song LP, Timeless Town, was released in late 2025, with a cassette also available from All Night Flight records and vinyl from Kashual Plastik, both based in Germany. This release led to a Rolling Stone retrospective of her ten best albums, with the reviewer noting "sometimes it’s enough to simply savour a moment and really sit in it. Therein lies the energy that makes her songcraft so potent, calm, and healing."
