= At Swim 2 Birds =

Studio album by Peter Jefferies and Jono Lonie
- Released: 1987
- Recorded: 1987 at Jono's house in Dunedin, New Zealand
- Genre: Experimental rock
- Length: 29:52 (vinyl edition); 34:20 (CD edition)
- Label: Flying Nun

Peter Jefferies chronology
| At Swim 2 Birds (1987) | The Last Great Challenge in a Dull World (1990) |

Professional ratings
Review scores
| Source | Rating |
|---|---|
| Allmusic | 3/5 stars |

At Swim 2 Birds is a collaborative album by Peter Jefferies and Jono Lonie, released in 1987 through Flying Nun Records. Its title may reference the novel of the same name.

== Track listing ==
All music is composed by Peter Jefferies & Jono Lonie, except "Tarantella" co-written by Mick Dobday.

Side one
| No. | Title | Length |
|---|---|---|
| 1. | "Introduction" | 1:48 |
| 2. | "Thief With the Silver" | 2:04 |
| 3. | "Piano (One)" | 4:42 |
| 4. | "Interalia" | 2:24 |
| 5. | "At Swim 2 Birds" | 4:27 |

Side two
| No. | Title | Length |
|---|---|---|
| 1. | "Tarantella" | 3:22 |
| 2. | "Where The Flies Sleep" | 1:40 |
| 3. | "The Standing Stone" | 2:20 |
| 4. | "Short Was Fast" | 0:50 |
| 5. | "Piano (Two)" | 6:16 |

CD Version
| No. | Title | Length |
|---|---|---|
| 1. | "Introduction" | 1:49 |
| 2. | "Thief With the Silver" | 2:08 |
| 3. | "Piano (One)" | 4:46 |
| 4. | "Interalia" | 2:31 |
| 5. | "At Swim 2 Birds" | 4:35 |
| 6. | "Tarantella" | 3:29 |
| 7. | "Where The Flies Sleep" | 1:42 |
| 8. | "The Standing Stone" | 2:27 |
| 9. | "Aerial" | 3:45 |
| 10. | "Short Was Fast" | 0:47 |
| 11. | "Piano (Two)" | 6:21 |

== Personnel ==
- Peter Jefferies – drums, tape, percussion, piano, guitar on "Introduction"
- Jono Lonie – guitar, tape, percussion, violin
- Sally Lonie – illustrations
