= Candee Jay =

Dutch Eurodance group

- Origin: Rotterdam, Netherlands
- Genres: Eurodance
- Years active: 2003–2006;2013–present
- Label: Flight Music

Candee Jay is a Dutch Eurodance group fronted by lead singer Ilze Lankhaar and produced by Alice Deejay producers Eelke Kalberg and Sebastiaan 'DJ Pronti' Molijn.

== Career ==
Together with Jezebel Zwiers and Elske Cinibulk as background dancers, the Candee Jay project aimed to be as successful as Alice Deejay. Candee Jay's biggest hit singles are "If I Were You", "Back For Me" and "Lose This Feeling". The first two became top 40 hits in the United Kingdom, "If I Were You" reaching #14 in June 2004 and "Back For Me" peaking at #23 in November 2004.

Candee Jay has released one album, Electrifying, in the UK, but it failed to make the chart there. Candee Jay made a moderate impression in the United States with "If I Were You" and "Back For Me." Both singles sold well, and featured on the Hot Dance Singles Sales chart. However, Electrifying failed to appear on all Stateside music charts, including the Top Electronic Albums list.

Before her career as the lead singer of Candee Jay, Lankhaar was a professional model and graduated from Lucia Marthas Dance Academy. Zwiers and Cinibulk also graduated from Lucia Marthas.

At the end of 2006 and up to March 2007, Lankhaar appeared on several episodes of the Dutch real-life series "De Bauers", which follows Frans Bauer, a famous Dutch singer, while he is creating his concerts. Lankhaar was followed in the first episode of the series while she was auditioning for being a background dancer. On the other episodes she just was asked to share some opinions. She has said on television that she has worked with him before. Whilst Lankhaar was still auditioning, Zwiers and Cinibulk were already background dancers for Frans Bauer during his show in Rotterdam Ahoy.

In 2008 Jezebel Zwiers was one of the contestants on the Dutch television program So You Think You Can Dance. The judges often described her choreographies as sexy or hot, though she was voted off by them before making it into the finals.

== Discography ==
=== Albums ===
- Electrifying (2004) – UK No. 60
1. "If I Were You"
2. "Back for Me"
3. "Lose This Feeling"
4. "Every Party"
5. "Oh Boy"
6. "Without You"
7. "Fiesta in Mexico"
8. "Forever and a Day"
9. "You Don't Seem"
10. "I Will Find You"
11. "Rising into Love"
12. "Another Year"
- True Love Waits

Candee Jay's second album was to be entitled True Love Waits. However, after Electrifying failed to have much chart success, the issue of the second album was cancelled. Yet, two songs from the album, "Back in Love" and "Love Is a Fire" were released on Myspace along with a remix of "Better Off Alone".

1. "Back in Love"
2. "Love Is a Fire"
3. "Better Off Alone"
4. "True Love Waits"
5. "Sunny" (cover of the Bobby Hebb song)

=== Singles ===
- "If I Were You" (2003) – UK No. 14
- "Back for Me" (2004) – UK No. 23
- "Lose This Feeling" (2005)
