= Strange News from the Angels =

Studio album by The 3Ds
- Released: 1996
- Recorded: November 1995
- Label: Flying Nun Records

The 3Ds chronology
Caterwauling (1994)	Strange News from the Angels (1996)

Professional ratings
Review scores
Source	Rating
AllMusic	3/5 stars
NME	4/10

Strange News from the Angels is the third and final album by the New Zealand band the 3Ds. It was released by Flying Nun Records in 1996.

== Production ==
The album was recorded in November 1995. The band used the relocated Fish St. Studios, on Burlington St.

== Critical reception ==
The Sydney Morning Herald wrote: "Though basically a pop group with snarly guitars, 3Ds' records manage to sustain a feeling of mystery that stamps them as different. Their tunes don't yield hidden meanings when probed but glow with particular emotions—anger, contentment, disappointment, depression, the admiration of simple beauty." CMJ New Music Monthly thought that "the 3Ds' subtle ease into a less frenetic groove isn't damaging ... the eeriness of their 'pop' songs is only heightened more by the drawing out."

== Track listing ==
1. "Dust" – 2:46
2. "Seven Days of Kindness" – 3:46
3. "Fangworld" – 5:07
4. "Animal" – 4:52
5. "Vector 27" – 2:03
6. "Riding the Whale" – 3:22
7. "The Fiery Angel" – 4:20
8. "Ben" – 3:37
9. "Devil Red" – 4:11
10. "Big Red Heart" – 3:04
11. "I Believe in You" – 3:03
12. "Castaway" – 3:10
13. "Carrion Days" – 4:27
14. "The Wish" – 3:40

== Personnel ==
- David Mitchell – guitar, vocals
- Denise Roughan – bass, vocals, tambourine, keyboards
- David Saunders – guitar, vocals
- Dominic Stones – drums, cymbals, sticks
