= Durie Hill Elevator =

Public elevator in Whanganui, New Zealand

Coordinates: 39°56.202′S 175°03.650′E

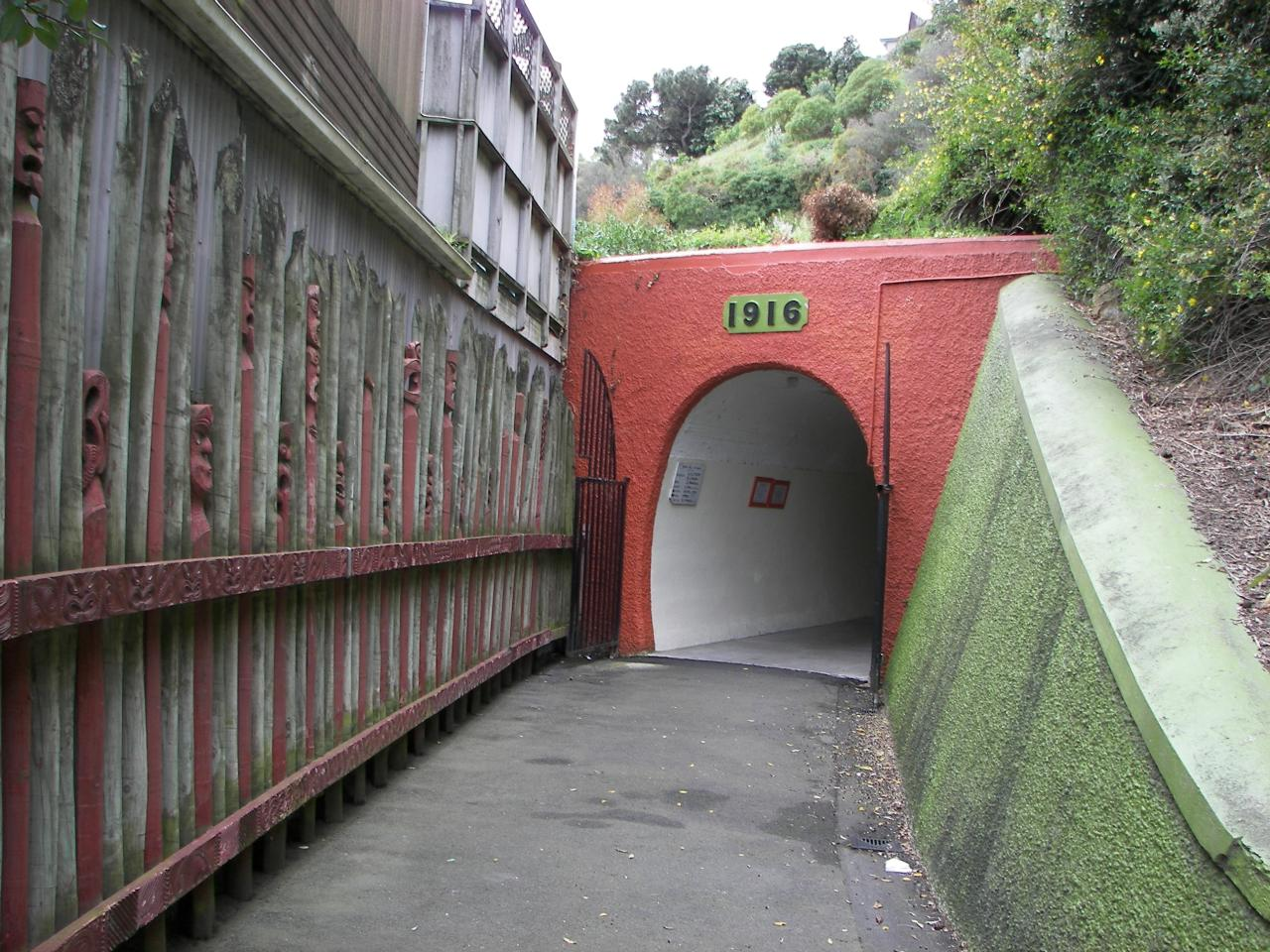
Entrance at Anzac Parade

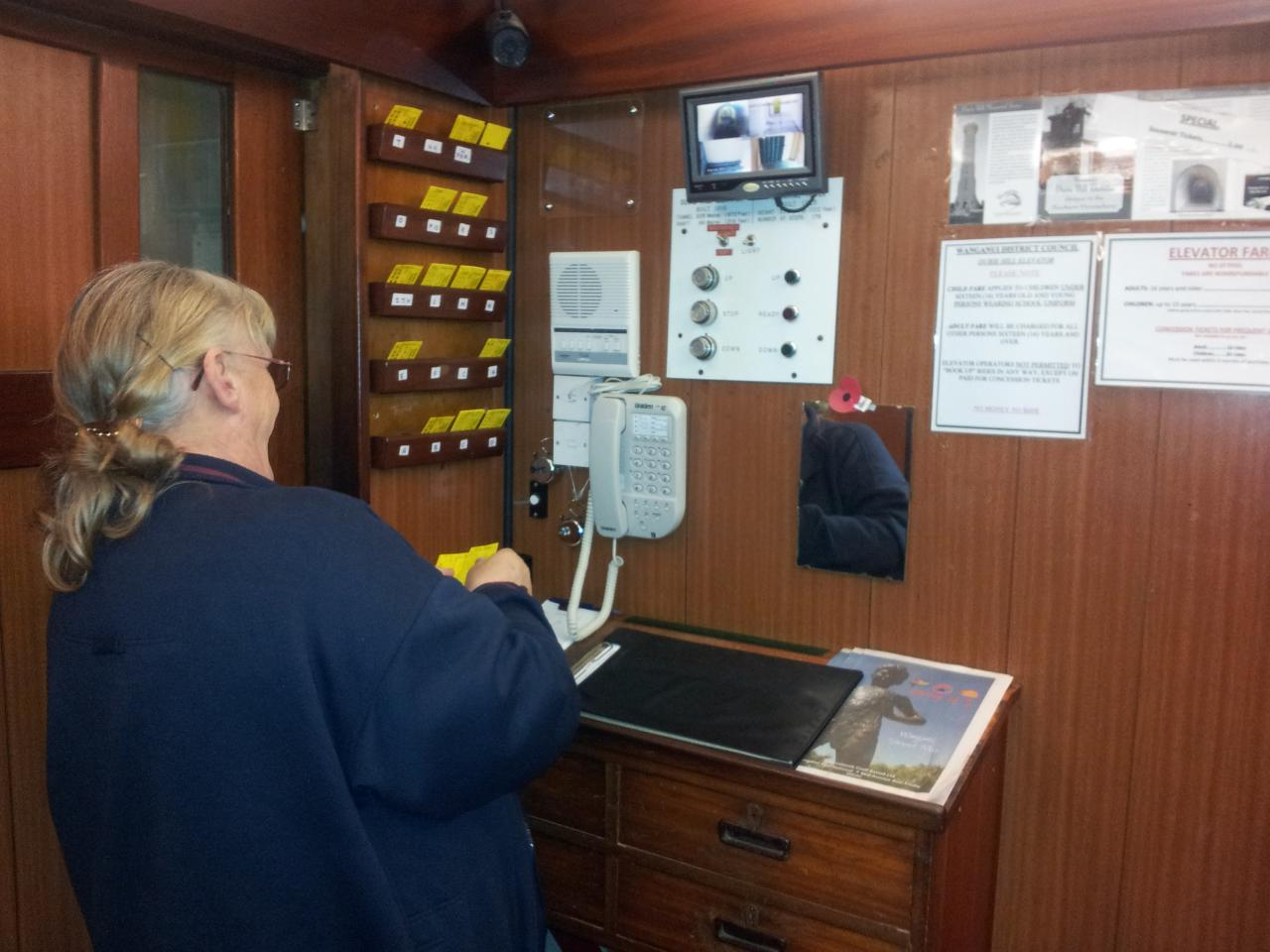
Elevator control panel

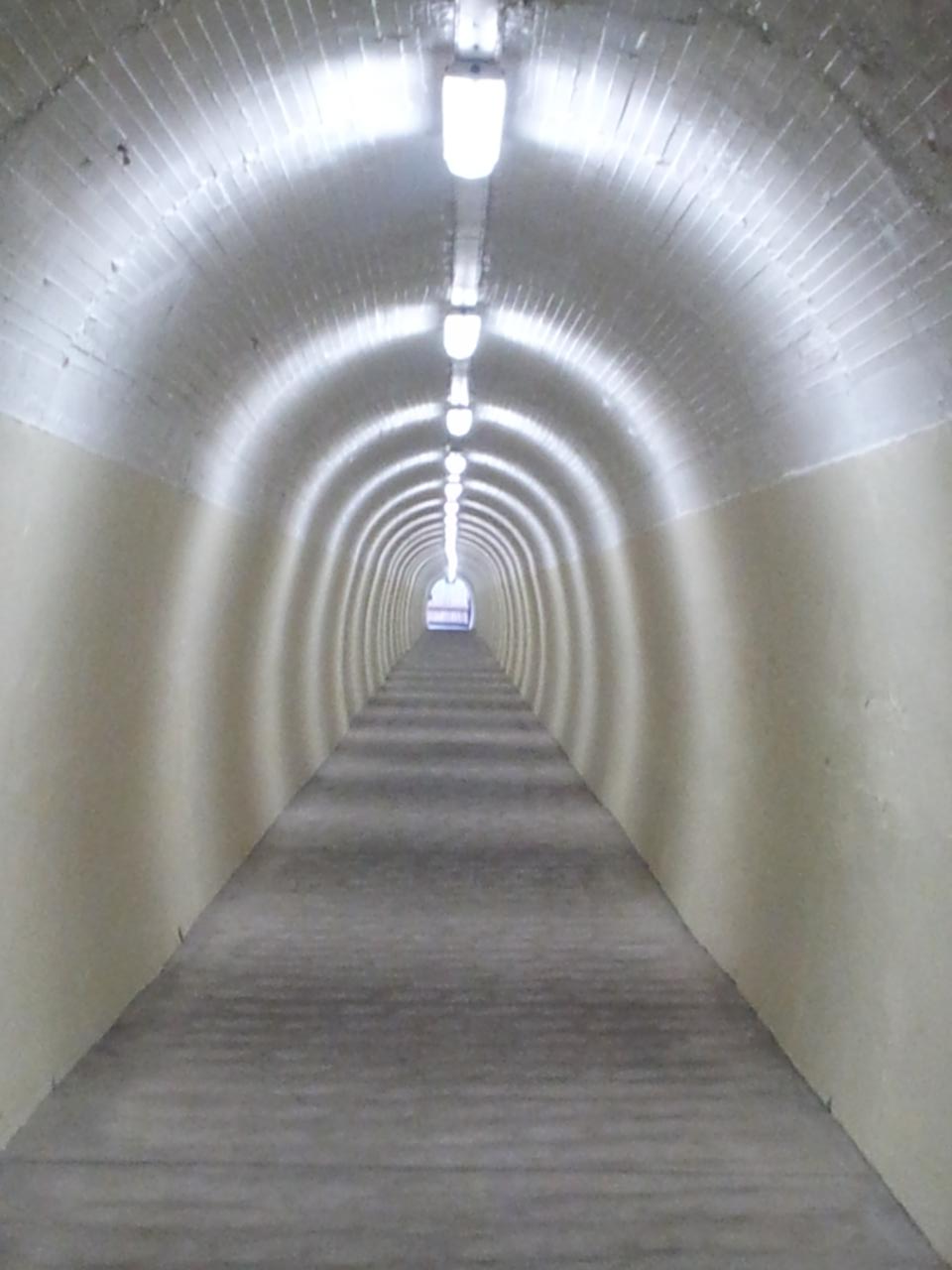
Entrance tunnel

The Durie Hill Elevator is a public elevator in Whanganui, on the North Island of New Zealand. It connects Anzac Parade beside the Whanganui River with the suburb of Durie Hill. It is ranked by Heritage New Zealand as a Category 1 Historic Place, and is New Zealand's only public underground elevator. (Note: There are other elevators accessible to the public, such as those between Lambton Quay and The Terrace in Wellington, but those are privately owned, while the Durie Hill Elevator is publicly owned and classified as a public transport service.)

== Planning ==
When Durie Hill became part of Wanganui Borough in 1910, access was via a concrete staircase (a 191-step staircase still exists today). The Council needed to provide public transport to the hilltop settlement, however. Various solutions including a cable car were proposed, but an elevator up through the hill was decided upon, as "the most convenient, the safest, the most economical, and the most suited for the circumstances of the particular locality".

External videos
- Tunnel and elevator (A walkthrough from the entrance to the lookout tower)

The elevator and tunnel were proposed by Wanganui Chronicle editor John Ball and his friend, Technical School engineering instructor Edward Crow. Ratepayers were not prepared to pay for the project, and only a quarter of the 80 or 90 families buying sections in the new suburb were interested in forming a cooperative, so Col. A. E. Wilson and his brother-in-law W. J. Polson formed the Durie Town Elevator Co. to build it.

== Construction ==
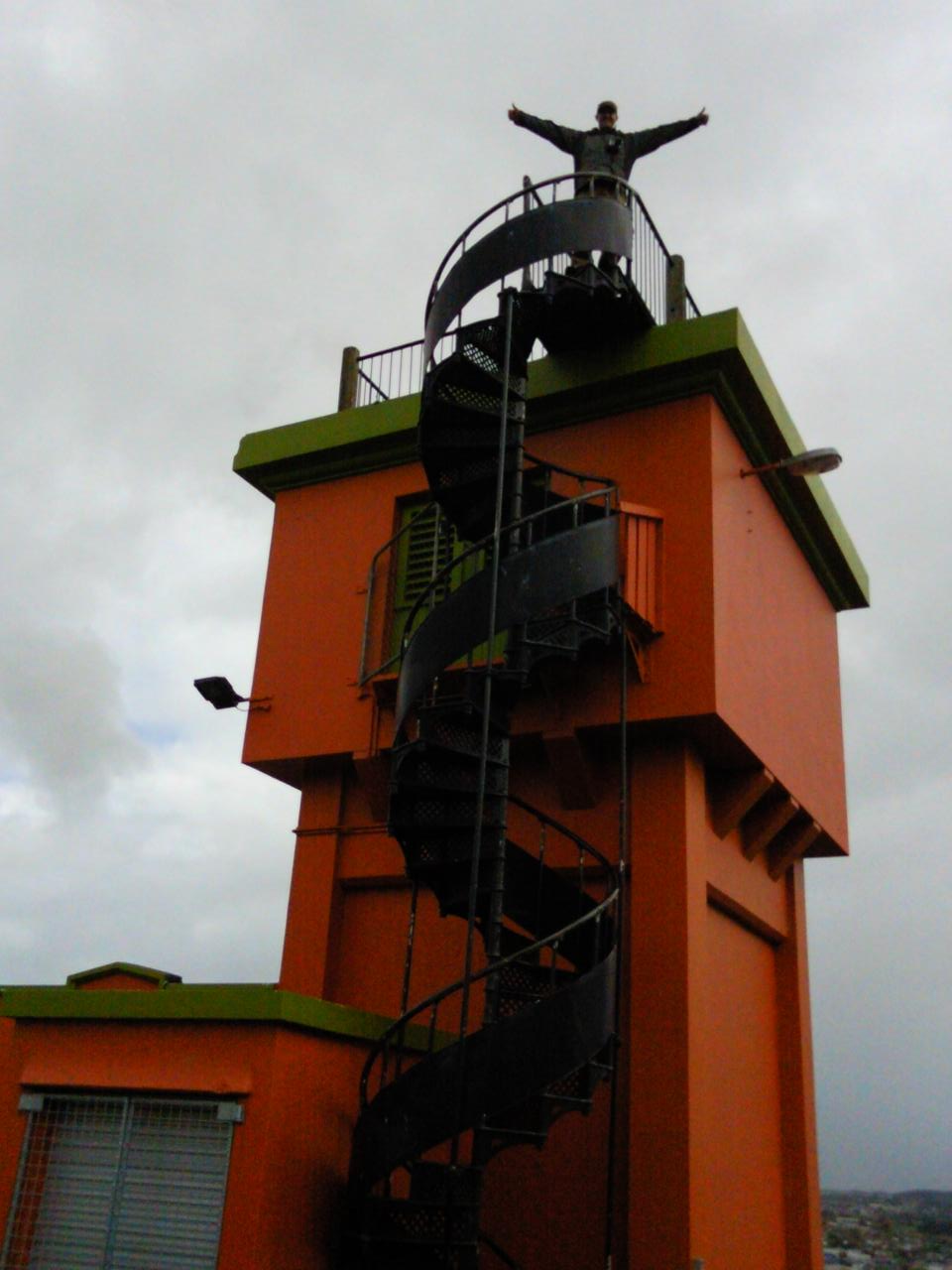
Tower at the top of Durie Hill

Contractors Maxwell and Mann began construction in 1916. The structure consists of a 205 m long, 3 m high entrance tunnel (technically an adit, rather than a tunnel, as it has only one entrance), a 65.8 m vertical elevator shaft, and a 9.7 m flat-topped tower at the summit, all consuming 2,500 tons of reinforced concrete. The entrance was buried by a landslide soon after excavation started, but construction was otherwise without incident. The British-built 40 horsepower machinery was installed by a firm who had already put 180 elevators into buildings throughout New Zealand, and had a capacity of 500 passengers per hour both ways. The Durie Hill Elevator was formally opened on 2 August 1919 (although the iron staircase to the tower roof had not yet arrived).

== Operation ==
The Council initially set fares at 4d to go up and 2d to come down (3d and 1d for children). The 500 volts DC for the elevator came from the city tram system; in 1951 a mercury arc rectifier was installed to convert electricity from the 230 volt AC local distribution network to 500V DC after the tram system was removed. Operation of the elevator was passed to the Wanganui City Council on 1 June 1942; the city still operates it. The Council runs monthly checks of the elevator, and closes it for one day a year for a full inspection, as well as on Christmas Day. The previous operator, Zena Mabbot, had operated it since 1971. In 2021, after a three-month refurbishment, operation was taken over by a company set up by singer-songwriter Anthonie Tonnon.

The construction of an elevator allowed the development in 1920 of the first modern New Zealand suburb, Durie Hill Garden Suburb, planned by the architect Samuel Hurst Seager. Reliable transport to the hilltop was important before widespread automobile ownership; today the Durie Hill Elevator is as much a tourist attraction as a form of public transport, because of the panoramic views at the summit that can include both Mt Ruapehu and Mt Taranaki.
