= Set Free (album) =

Studio album by the American Analog Set
- Released: September 20, 2005
- Recorded: 2004–2005 in Texas, New York & Mississippi
- Genre: Indie rock
- Length: 41:36
- Labels: Arts & Crafts, Morr Music
- Producer: The American Analog Set

The American Analog Set chronology
Promise of Love (2003)	Set Free (2005)

Professional ratings
Review scores
Source	Rating
AllMusic	3.5/5 stars
Pitchfork	6.8/10
Rolling Stone	2.5/5 stars

Set Free is an album by the American Analog Set. It was released on September 20, 2005, on Arts & Crafts. This album was chosen as one of Amazon.com's Top 100 Editor's Picks of 2005.

== Track listing ==
No.	Title	Length
1.	"Born on the Cusp"	3:28
2.	"Immaculate Heart 1"	2:39
3.	"Immaculate Heart 2"	2:12
4.	"Cool Kids Keep"	3:44
5.	"She's Half"	4:29
6.	"JR" (Originally by the band Codeine)	3:41
7.	"Play Hurt"	4:32
8.	"(Theme from) Everything Ends"	2:15
9.	"Sharp Briar"	2:42
10.	"The Green Green Grass"	3:32
11.	"First of Four"	3:04
12.	"Fuck This... I'm Leaving"	5:18
