= Another Year (Nocturnal Projections album) =

EP by Nocturnal Projections
- Released: 1982
- Recorded: June–July 1982
- Studio: Stebbing Recording Centre
- Label: Hit Singles
- Producer: Tony Moan, Nocturnal Projections

Nocturnal Projections chronology
Nerve Ends in Power Line/In Purgatory (1982)	Another Year (1982)	Nerve Ends in Power Line (1995)

Another Year is an EP by New Zealand band Nocturnal Projections in 1982.

== Track listing ==
- All songs written and arranged by Nocturnal Projections (Copyright Control).
1. "You'll Never Know" 3:26
2. "Isn't that Strange" 3:26
3. "Could It Be Increased" 3:10
4. "Difficult Days" 5:35
5. "Out of My Hands" 4:26
