= Hellzapoppin' (album) =

Studio album by The 3Ds
- Released: 1992
- Label: USA: Festival Records D 30761; NZL: Flying Nun Records FNCD225

The 3Ds chronology
Fish Tales/Swarthy Songs for Swabs (1991)	Hellzapoppin' (1992)	Beautiful Things EP (1993)

Professional ratings
Review scores
Source	Rating
AllMusic	4/5 stars
Select	5/5 stars
Spin Alternative Record Guide	8/10

Hellzapoppin is the first full-length album by the New Zealand band the 3Ds, released in 1992.

The album peaked at No. 24 on the New Zealand albums chart.

== Production ==
The album was recorded at Fish Street Studio, in Dunedin, New Zealand.

== Critical reception ==
Trouser Press wrote: "Overstuffed with the Davids’ punchy guitar lines and fervently chased by their sing-songy vocal shouts, 'Outer Space' perfectly captures the group’s spastic energy and crisp melodicism." Spin placed the album at No. 1 on its list of "10 Best Albums You Didn't Hear In '92", and praised the "sprawling, skywriting six-string heroics."

== Track listing ==
Side one

1. "Outer Space" – 3:14
2. "Ugly Day" – 2:52
3. "Sunken Head" – 3:45
4. "Swallow" – 2:44
5. "Sunken Treasure" – 3:48
6. "Hellzapoppin'" – 2:22

Side two

1. "Leave the Dogs to Play" – 3:19
2. "Hairs" – 2:37
3. "Something in the Water" – 2:22
4. "Homo Necans" – 3:20
5. "One Eye Opened" – 2:32
6. "Teacher Is Dead" – 3:05
7. "Jewel" – 4:05

Bonus track

1. "Baby's on Fire" (Brian Eno) – 4:10 (B-side to the "Outer Space" 7" single)

== Personnel ==
- David Mitchell – guitar, vocals
- Denise Roughan – bass guitar, keyboards, vocals
- David Saunders – guitar, vocals
- Dominic Stones – drums
