= Fish Tales (EP) =

EP by The 3Ds
- Released: 1990
- Genre: Rock
- Label: Flying Nun Records

The 3Ds chronology
| Fish Tales (1990) | Swarthy Songs for Swabs (1990) |

Professional ratings
Review scores
| Source | Rating |
|---|---|
| AllMusic | 4/5 stars |

Fish Tales is a 12"-EP by New Zealand band the 3Ds, released in 1990.

== Track listing ==
1. "First Church"
2. "Dream of Herge"
3. "Evil Kid"
4. "Fish Tails"
5. "Evocation of W.C. Fields"
6. "Mud Sacrifice"
7. "The Ball of Purple Cotton"
