= Nocturnal Projections =

New Zealand rock band

- Origin: Stratford, New Zealand
- Genres: Post-punk
- Years active: 1981–1983
- Past members: Peter Jefferies; Graeme Jefferies; Brett Jones; Gordon Rutherford

Nocturnal Projections were a post-punk band from Stratford, near New Plymouth, New Zealand that began recording in 1981 and split up in 1983. Often compared to British bands, especially Joy Division, with whom they shared a moody, bass-driven sound, although the Projections' guitar was less metallic and more ebullient than Joy Division’s. They also never underwent the exacting production of many such British bands.

== History ==
Nocturnal Projections were Peter Jefferies (vocals), his brother Graeme Jefferies (guitar), Brett Jones (bass), and Gordon Rutherford (drums). Peter and Graeme subsequently formed This Kind of Punishment, which played together through the late 1980s. Graeme would then launch Cakekitchen, while Peter would go on to release several solo albums.

The brothers played in a series of punk bands (such as the Plastic Bags) before forming Nocturnal Projections; though none of those early efforts have been released, some of the songs (including "Walk in a Straight Line") would be recorded by Nocturnal Projections.

The band’s first release was the 1981 Things That Go Bunt in the Night tape, which was recorded direct to cassette and released in extremely limited quantities, perhaps as few as 100 copies. Within the year they followed up with a second cassette, November 1981, which seems to have been recorded on at least a four-track deck.

The band released its first records in 1982, a 7" ("Nerve Ends in Power Lines", backed with "In Purgatory") and the Another Year 12" EP.

Nocturnal Projections' final record was a three-song 12" in 1983 (Understanding, Another Year, In Darkness). Peter Jefferies later despaired of the over-produced sound the band achieved in its only work with a proper studio. Two live tracks from this time would also make it to record: the expansive "Words Fail Me" (eventually reworked into a This Kind of Punishment song) on the 1986 Biding Our Time compilation, and the anthemic "Walk in a Straight Line" on the 1990 Xpressway Pile=Up compilation.

== Post-breakup releases ==
In 1995 Raffmond, a European label, released the Nerve Ends in Powerlines CD of eleven Nocturnal Projections tracks, some of which had been unreleased. Buried at the end of the CD were four unlisted songs taken from the two cassettes.

Songs from the first tape have appeared on the Hate Your Neighbours CD (1997), the Worldview 7" (1998), and the Move to Riot CD compilation (2002).

In 2018 nine live recordings, all taken from sound desks, were compiled into an album called Inmates in Images.

== Discography ==
Date of Release	Title	Label	Charted	Country	Catalog Number
Albums
1981	Things That Go Bunt in the Night §		-	-	
1982	November 1981		-	-	
1995	Nerve Ends in Power Lines (CD rerelease)	Raffmond	-	-	
Live album
2018	Inmates in Images	-	-		
EPs
1982	Another Year	-	44	NZ	
1983	Understanding, Another Year, In Darkness		-	-	
Singles
1982	Nerve Ends in Power Lines/In Purgatory		-	-	
1998	Worldview	Raw Power Records	-	-	

- § recorded direct to cassette and released in extremely limited quantities.

=== Featured appearances ===
The group have appeared on a few compilations since the 1980s. The following is a list of these albums that have featured tracks by the Nocturnal Projections.

- (1986) - Biding Our Time (Failsafe Records) - Words Fail Me
- (1990) - Xpressway Pile-Up (Xpressway) - Walk in a Straight Line
- (1997) - Hate Your Neighbours (Zerox Records)
- (1997) - Move to Riot (Raw Power Records) -
