= The American Analog Set =

American indie rock/lo-fi band

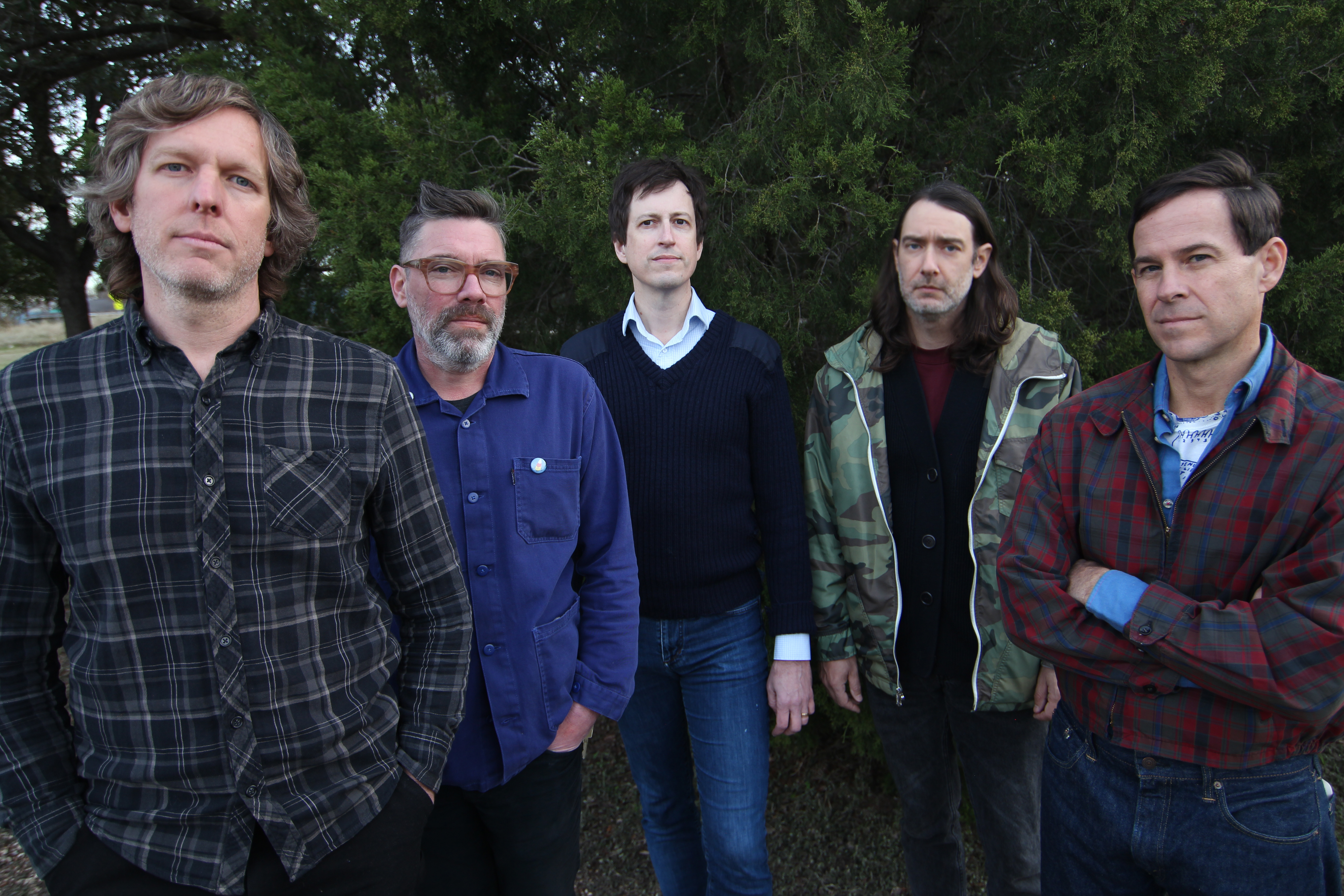
- The American Analog Set in 2023

Background information
- Origin: Austin, Texas, U.S.
- Genres: Indie rock; slowcore; lo-fi; post-rock
- Years active: 1995–2005; 2023-present
- Labels: Emperor Jones; Tiger Style; Arts & Crafts; Numero Group
- Members: Andrew Kenny; Jesse Lee; Mark Smith; Tom Hoff; Sean Ripple; Matt Frank
- Past members: Lisa Roschmann; Craig McCaffrey; Shawn O'Keefe; Josh Wright
- Website: amanset.com

The American Analog Set (sometimes referred to as AmAnSet) is an American indie rock band based in Austin, Texas, formed in 1995. They have released seven studio albums on various independent record labels, including Emperor Jones, Tiger Style Records, and Arts & Crafts.

On October 27, 2023, the band released For Forever, their first album of new material since 2005. On February 9, 2024, The Numero Group released New Drifters, a box set containing the band's first three studio albums, and two albums worth of unreleased demos, b-sides and outtakes. On April 10 2024, The Numero Group announced on their Instagram that they were working on a box set for the group's Tiger Style era material.

== History ==
Forming in 1995, the group's early sound was highly influenced by krautrock and post-rock, as well as British shoegaze bands like Cocteau Twins, often featuring long instrumental passages. Over time, their songs became shorter and more pop-influenced. The band has released seven full-length albums, four EPs, and several singles during their existence.

The band is led by singer-songwriter and guitarist Andrew Kenny. Additional members include, or have included, Jesse Lee, Mark Smith, Craig McCaffrey, Tom Hoff, Lisa Roschmann, and Sean Ripple. Founding member Roschmann left the band in late 1999, with Hoff and Ripple joining in early 2000. McCaffery replaced Hoff in 2003 for the band's sixth studio album, Set Free. Hoff later rejoined the current lineup in 2013.

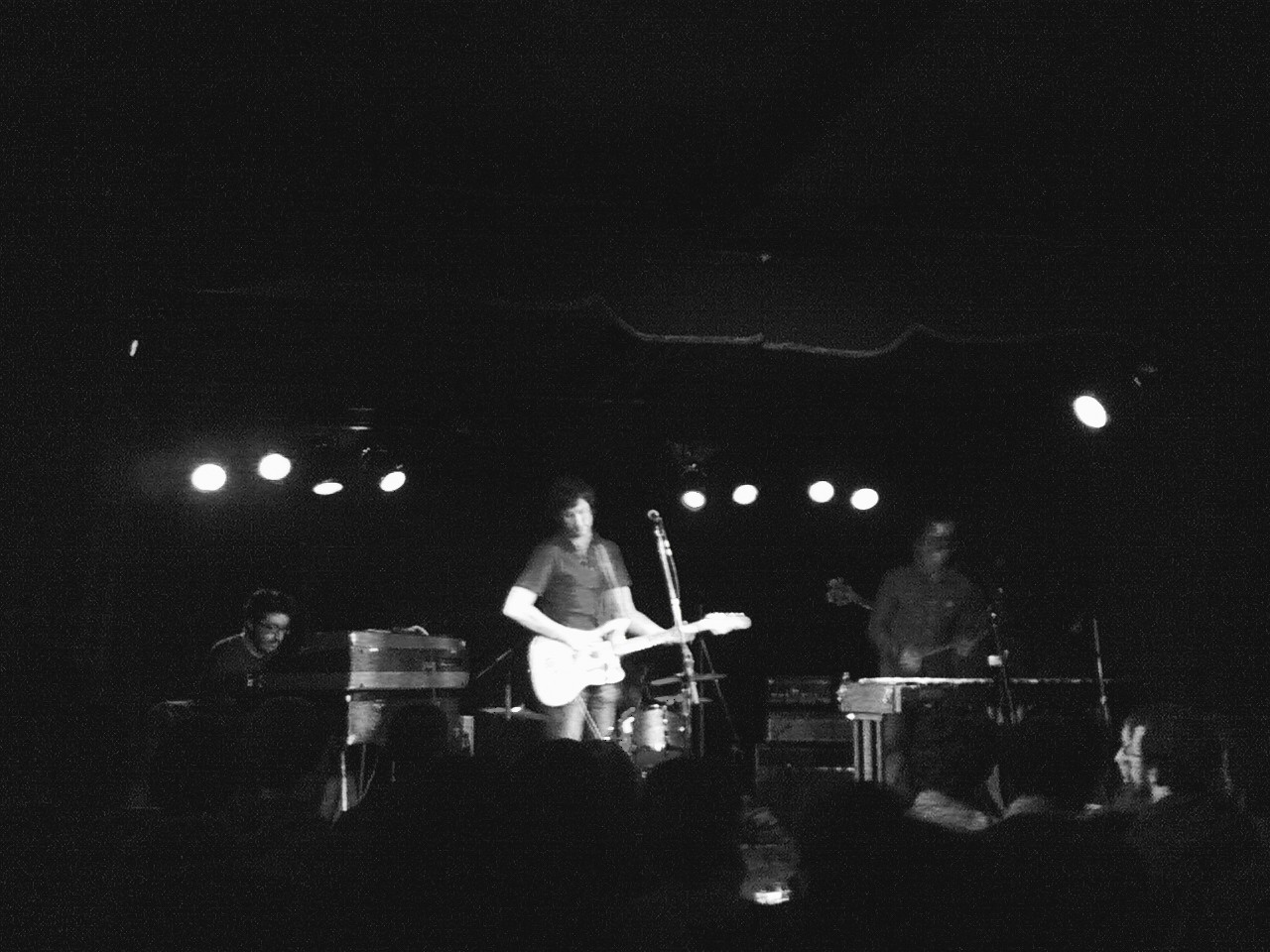
The American Analog Set performing live in 2005.

In October 2005, rumors began spreading across the internet that the group was on the verge of disbanding. The band quickly refuted such rumors, but added that they may not tour again due to their obligations with other projects. 2005's Set Free, was released in North America by Canadian record label Arts & Crafts Productions.

In 2009, "Gone to Earth" from Know by Heart appeared as a part of the soundtrack for the romantic-sci-fi film The Time Traveler's Wife.

The band released For Forever, their first full-length album in 18 years, on October 27, 2023. Ian Cohen of Pitchfork described the album as "an ever-so-slightly sharper edge on their familiar, slow-burning indie rock", comparing it to the likes of Yo La Tengo and Stereolab. In September 2024, the band reunited to perform live for the first time in 13 years. The performance took place in their hometown of Austin.

== Band members ==
=== Current members ===
- Andrew Kenny - guitar, vocals, organ, electric piano, synth (1995-2005, 2013–present)
- Jesse Lee - bass, tapes (1995-2005, 2013–present)
- Mark Smith - drums (1995-2005, 2013–present)
- Sean Ripple - vibraphone, backing vocals, guitar, drums and percussion (2000-2005, 2021–present)
- Tom Hoff - organ, electric piano, guitar, drums (2000-2003, 2013–present)

=== Former members ===
- Lisa Roschmann - organ, electric piano, flute, backing vocals (1995-1999)
- Craig McCaffrey - organ, electric piano (2003-2005)

=== Live members ===
- Shawn O'Keefe - guitar (1997-2000)
- Josh Wright - guitar (1999)
- Matt Frank - drums (2024-present)

== Discography ==
=== Studio albums ===
- The Fun of Watching Fireworks (1996, Emperor Jones)
- From Our Living Room to Yours (1997, Emperor Jones)
- The Golden Band (1999, Emperor Jones)
- Know by Heart (2001, Tiger Style)
- Promise of Love (2003, Tiger Style)
- Set Free (2005, Arts & Crafts)
- For Forever (2023, Hometown Fantasy)

=== Live albums ===
- Bootleg Club Volume One: 1996-1999 (2014)
- Bootleg Club Volume Two: 2000-2002 (2014)
- Bootleg Club Volume Three: 2003-2005 (2014)

=== Extended plays ===
- Late One Sunday & The Following Morning (1997, Darla Records)
- Updates (2002, Tiger Style)
- Songs of Hurt and Healing (split w/ White Magic) (2005, Tylenol/Ouch!)
- Everything Ends in Spring (2005, Ruined Potential)

=== Singles ===
- Diana Slowburner II (1996, Emperor Jones)
- Magnificent Seventies (1997, Emperor Jones)
- After Hours Issue #2 (split w/ Adventures In Stereo) (1997, After Hours)
- The Only Living Boy Around (1999, Emperor Jones)
- New Equation (2001, Tiger Style)
- Devil In The Woods EP (split w/ The Twilight Singers and Jeff Hanson) (2003, Devil in the Woods)
- Queen of Her Own Parade (2023, The Numero Group)
- Where Did You Come From? (2023, The Numero Group)

=== Compilations ===
- Through the 1990s: Singles and Unreleased (2001, Emperor Jones)
- Hard to Find: Singles and Unreleased 2000-2005 (2009, Hometown Fantasy)
- New Drifters (2024, The Numero Group)
- Destroy Destroy Destroy (2026, The Numero Group)

=== Appearances ===
- New Voices Vol. 30 (1999)
- New Voices Vol. 49 (2002)
- Artist Sampler 2002-2003 (2003)
- Another Country (2003)
- Musikexpress 80: Sounds Now! (2003)
- Off The Wall: 10 Years of Wall of Sound (2003)
- We Love You... So Love Us Three (2004)
- Comes With A Smile #15: Gloved Hands in Squeeze (2005)
- La Revolution de Spunk (2005)
- All Tomorrow's Parties 3.1 (2005)
- Electracoustic (2006)
- Duyster.II (2006)
- Peace on Earth (2008)
- Not Given Lightly (2009)
- Morr Music 2005 (2013)
- The Best of the Bliss Out (2015)
