= Promise of Love =

Studio album by the American Analog Set
- Released: June 17, 2003
- Recorded: Austin, Texas
- Genre: Indie rock
- Length: 39:16
- Label: Tiger Style Records
- Producer: The American Analog Set

The American Analog Set chronology
Know by Heart (2001)	Promise of Love (2003)	Set Free (2005)

Professional ratings
Review scores
Source	Rating
AllMusic	3/5 stars
Pitchfork	7.9/10.0

Promise of Love is an album by the American Analog Set. It was released on June 17, 2003, on Tiger Style Records.

== Track listing ==
No.	Title	Length
1.	"Continuous Hit Music"	4:27
2.	"Hard to Find"	4:17
3.	"Come Home Baby Julie, Come Home"	5:53
4.	"You Own Me"	5:05
5.	"Promise of Love"	2:13
6.	"The Hatist"	3:43
7.	"Fool Around"	5:36
8.	"Modern Drummer"	8:02
