= Ola Podrida =

- Origin: Austin, Texas United States
- Genres: Indie rock
- Years active: 2007-present
- Labels: Western Vinyl
- Members: David Wingo; Matt Clark; David Hobizal; Colin Swietek

Ola Podrida is an Austin, Texas indie rock band. They are led by film composer David Wingo. The band has released three albums, which have received favorable reviews in publications such as Pitchfork Media, Spin, Paste, and AllMusic.

== Discography ==
Year	Title	Label
2007	Ola Podrida	Plug Research
2009	Belly of the Lion	Western Vinyl
2013	Ghosts Go Blind	Western Vinyl
