= Peter Jefferies =

New Zealand musician

Peter Jefferies is a musician from New Zealand. He is known for his involvement with Nocturnal Projections and This Kind of Punishment as well as his extensive solo and collaborative work.

== History ==
In 1981 Peter and his brother Graeme Jefferies formed the post-punk band Nocturnal Projections. The band released a few records, and performed around their hometown of New Plymouth, as well as Auckland. After Nocturnal Projections disbanded in 1983, the brothers formed This Kind of Punishment, and released three full-length albums and an EP. In 1985 Jefferies released the Randolph's Going Home 7" and the "fish out of water" 12" with Shayne Carter. This was followed in 1987 with the At Swim 2 Birds LP, recorded with Jono Lonie, on the Flying Nun label. This was reissued on Xpressway and later on Drunken Fish. The Catapult 7", a collaboration with Robbie Muir, was released on Xpressway in 1989, reissued by the Chicago-based Ajax label in 1991. Further recordings by Jefferies and Muir were released by Ajax in 1992 as the double 7" Swerve. The Last Great Challenge in a Dull World album was released on cassette by the Xpressway label in 1990. Another collaboration with Shayne Carter, the Knocked Out or Thereabout 7", was released on Flying Nun in 1992. The Electricity LP was released on Ajax in 1994, followed by Elevator Madness on Emperor Jones in 1996, then Substatic on Trance Syndicate in 1998, and Closed Circuit in 2001 (also on Trance Syndicate). Jefferies formed 2 Foot Flame with Jean Smith of Mecca Normal. The band released two LPs on Matador Records, 1995's self titled LP, and 1997's Ultra Drowning.

The Last Great Challenge in a Dull World was re-issued in 2013 on vinyl by de Stijl records. At Swim 2 Birds was reissued by Flying Nun Records in 2017.

Jefferies lives in New Plymouth, New Zealand, and is employed three days per week at Spotswood College. He is a key member of the Music Department overseeing drum tuition, songwriting, mentoring students and he manages the recording studio every Friday with students enrolled in the school's Gateway Programme. He also runs a weekly session of music at the school's Special Needs Unit.

In addition, Jefferies is employed by two other high schools in Taranaki where he teaches drums and songwriting and records students' compositions: Stratford High School and Coastal Taranaki School. Jefferies is a part of the New Zealand Music Commission's "Music Mentoring in Schools Program", going into schools and fostering the development of songwriting and composition skills in primary, intermediate and secondary school students.

Musician Amanda Palmer described Jeffries as her "teenage idol". In 2012, Palmer said she had toured New Zealand for the past five years and always hoped to find a link that would lead her to Jefferies. The pair performed solo songs at Vinyl Countdown store in New Plymouth to a crowd of 40, before combining on a number of covers including Oasis's Wonderwall and Wild Thing.

== Discography ==
Solo albums:

- At Swim 2 Birds (1987)
- The Last Great Challenge in a Dull World (1990)
- Electricity (1994)
- Elevator Madness (1996)
- Substatic (1998)
- Closed Circuit (2001)

Compilation albums:

- Chorus of Interludes (1996)

With Nocturnal Projections:

- Nerve Ends in Power Lines (1995)

With This Kind of Punishment:

- This Kind of Punishment (1983)
- A Beard of Bees (1984)
- In the Same Room (1987)

With Cyclops:

- Goat Volume (1994)

With 2 Foot Flame:

- 2 Foot Flame (1995)
- Ultra Drowning (1997)
