= This Kind of Punishment =

New Zealand post-punk band

- Origin: Stratford, New Zealand
- Genres: Post-punk
- Years active: 1983–1988
- Past members: Chris Matthews; Graeme Jefferies; Johnny Pierce; Peter Jefferies

This Kind of Punishment were a New Zealand post-punk band formed in Stratford in 1983.

== History ==
The band was formed by brothers Peter and Graeme Jefferies, after the breakup of their post-punk outfit Nocturnal Projections. Their first self-titled album was recorded on 4-track recorder borrowed from Chris Knox, and released in an edition of 1000 on the Flying Nun label in 1983. It was reissued on the Roof Bolt label in 1998.

Their second album, A Beard of Bees, was recorded with an extended line-up, and self-released on vinyl in 1984. It was reissued on cassette by the Xpressway label in 1990, and again on CD by the Ajax label in the mid '90s.

In The Same Room, their third album, was released in 1987 by Flying Nun. It was reissued in 1993 by Ajax Records, and contained the tracks from their 5 By Four EP.

== Discography ==
=== LPs ===
- This Kind of Punishment (1983)
- A Beard of Bees (1984)
- In The Same Room (1987)

=== Singles & EPs ===
- 5 By Four (1985)
- Radio Silence (2016)

=== Compilations ===
- In The Same Room/5 By Four (1993)
