= The 3Ds =

New Zealand noise pop band

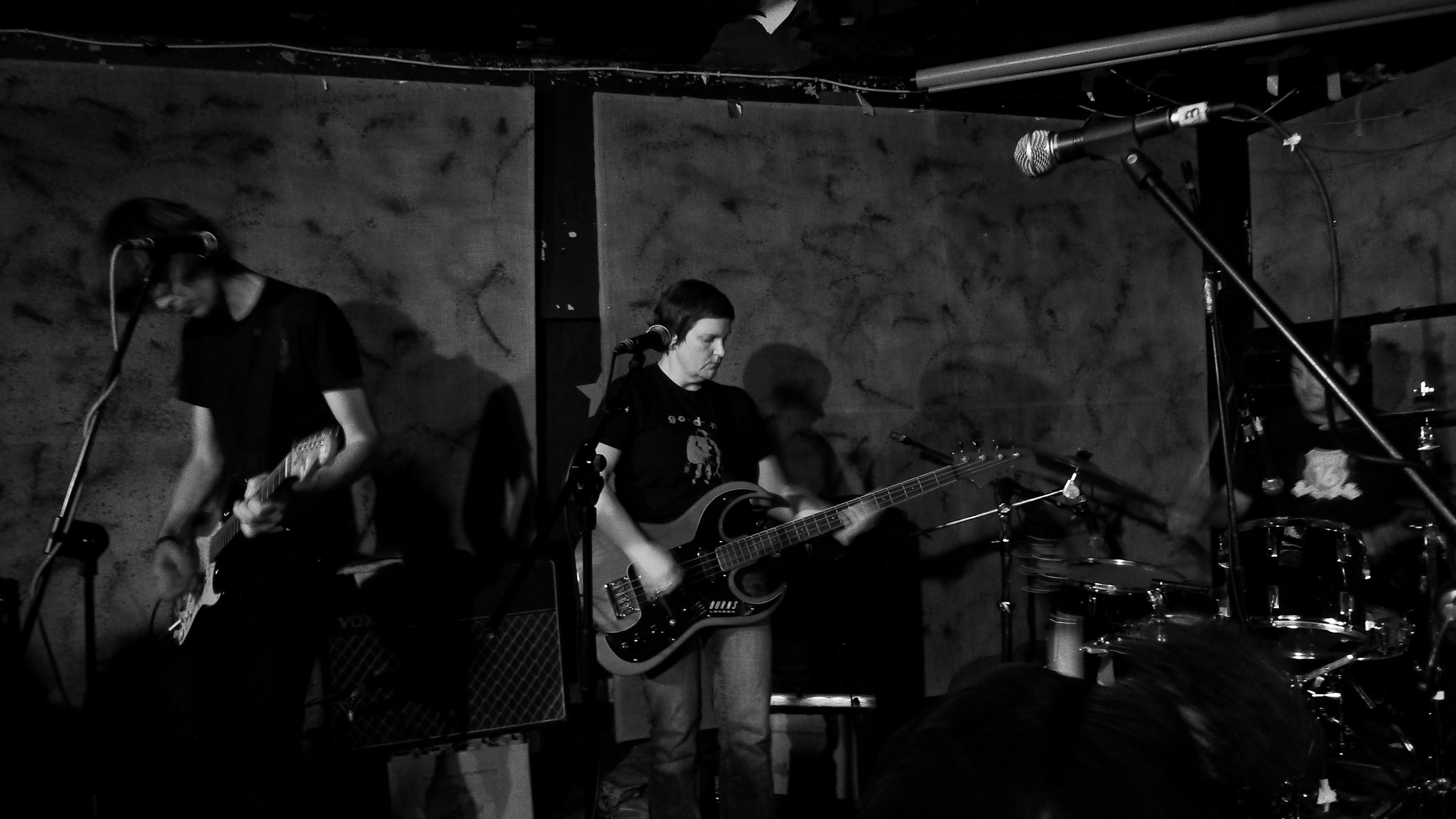

Background information
- Origin: Dunedin, New Zealand
- Genres: Noise pop; indie rock
- Years active: 1988–1997, 2009–2010
- Labels: Flying Nun Records
- Members: Dominic Stones; Denise Roughan; David Saunders; Dave Mitchell

The 3Ds were a New Zealand noise pop band based from Dunedin, together from 1988 to 1997. They recorded three albums and several EPs, the best known of which is The Venus Trail (1993). They achieved commercial and critical success worldwide in the period between 1992 and 1995.

== History ==
The band was formed in May 1988 by Dominic Stones, Denise Roughan and David Saunders. The band's name refers to the members' names all starting with "D". In 1989, they were joined by David Mitchell from Auckland bands Exploding Budgies and Goblin Mix, who introduced the twin-guitar attack which became the defining feature of the group. He also created all EP and album artwork apart from Fish Tales which featured a painting by Jane Davidson. Among their inspirations, in addition to the Pixies, they also consider Black Sabbath and Fairport Convention to be inspirations.

Their first recordings were demos, one of which, "Meluzina Man", became their first release on the 1990 compilation Xpressway Pileup. The band's first release for the Flying Nun label was the EP Fish Tales at the beginning of 1990, beginning a long collaboration with the label in Dunedin. Their second EP, Swarthy Songs for Swabs, and the first album, Hellzapoppin', were released over the next two years.

The first tour in the United States was in 1992, followed by an Australian tour with the Lemonheads.

In 1992, the band played with Nirvana in New Zealand.

Their second album was The Venus Trail, released in 1993. This included their best known singles "Hey Seuss" and "Beautiful Things."

In 1994, they returned to the U.S. for a three-month tour.

The 3Ds toured with Pavement in New Zealand and Australia. Following this, The 3Ds played two stadium shows supporting U2 on their Zoo TV tour in New Zealand. An associate of the band took a bottle of champagne from U2's dressing room without permission, leading the concert promoter to inform The 3Ds that they would not be paid for their performance. However, Bono was in the room at the time and insisted that The 3Ds be paid double, and given an additional bottle of champagne.

In 1997, the band released its third album, Strange News from the Angels.

The band announced it was splitting up in early 1997.

In July 2009, the 3Ds reformed to play two shows at the Merge Records 20th anniversary festival in Chapel Hill, North Carolina.

In 2010, the 3Ds toured New Zealand, including the inaugural Laneways festival. This was followed by an invitation to play at the Pavement-curated All Tomorrows Parties festival in the UK.

== Discography ==
=== Albums ===
Year	Title	Details	Peak chart positions
Year	Title	Details	NZ
1992	Hellzapoppin'	Label (NZ): Flying Nun Records; Label (US): First Warning Records; Catalogue: FN225	24
1993	The Venus Trail	Label (NZ): Flying Nun Records; Label (US): First Warning Records; Catalogue: FN281	12
1997	Strange News from the Angels	Label: Flying Nun Records; Catalogue: FN351	—
"—" denotes a recording that did not chart or was not released in that territory.

=== EPs ===
Year	Title	Details	Peak chart positions
Year	Title	Details	NZ
1990	Fish Tales	Recorded in a Dunedin studio called Fish Street Studios in 1990.; Label: Flying Nun Records; Catalogue: FN150	—
1991	Swarthy Songs For Swabs	Label: Flying Nun Records; Catalogue: FN167	—
1994	Caterwauling	Label: Flying Nun Records; Catalogue: FN318	—
"—" denotes a recording that did not chart or was not released in that territory.

=== Compilations ===
Year	Title	Details	Peak chart positions
Year	Title	Details	NZ
1991	Fish Tales/Swarthy Songs for Swabs	Label (NZ): Flying Nun Records; Label (US): First Warning Records; Catalogue: FN188	—
2011	We Bury The Living: Early Recordings 1989-90	Label (NZ): Flying Nun Records; Catalogue: FNCD508	—
"—" denotes a recording that did not chart or was not released in that territory.

=== Featured appearances ===
- (1995) Abbasalutely (Flying Nun Records) - "Mama Mia"
- (1997) Topless Women Talk About Their Lives (Flying Nun Records) - "Hey Seuss", "Animal" and "Spooky"
- (1999) Scarfies (Flying Nun Records) - "Outer Space"

=== Singles ===
Year	Title	Peak chart positions	Album
Year	Title	NZ	Album
1992	"Outer Space"	—	Hellzapoppin
1993	"Beautiful Things"	49	The Venus Trail
1993	"Hey Seuss"	—	The Venus Trail
1996	"Dust"	—	Strange News from the Angels
"—" denotes a recording that did not chart or was not released in that territory.

== Members ==
- Dominic Stones — drums
- Denise Roughan — bass guitar, keyboards, tambourine, vocals
- David Saunders — guitar, vocals
- David Mitchell — guitar, mandolin, vocals
