= Emperor Jones =

American record label

Emperor Jones is a small Austin, Texas based independent record label founded in 1995 by Craig Stewart as an offshoot of Trance Syndicate, the label he ran with his husband, Butthole Surfers drummer King Coffey. It has released albums by acts such as Alastair Galbraith, The American Analog Set, Roky Erickson, Thuja, ST37, The Mountain Goats, Stick Men with Ray Guns, Peter Jefferies, Pip Proud, Rusted Shut, Black Mayonnaise, Rahdunes, Shawn David McMillen, Grey Daturas, and Lord Fyre.

== History ==
Craig Stewart ran Emperor Jones from 1995 until 2007. According to The Austin Chronicle, the label's first release was a record by the veteran post-punk project My Dad Is Dead, and its first long-term act was Austin's The American Analog Set. By November 2003 the label had issued 64 releases, all arising from Stewart's personal connections, many of them from his years at Trance Syndicate. Its catalog was wide-ranging, from Roky Erickson of the 13th Floor Elevators to Houston punk band Rusted Shut, the label's newest signing at the time. The label also reissued the work of Pip Proud, a late-1960s cult figure, and early albums by The Mountain Goats.

In the 1990s the label released an album of previously unheard Roky Erickson songs to benefit the musician's trust fund. The Chronicle reported in 2003 that the label was in a precarious financial position, partly because of Stewart's unconventional tastes.

== Legacy ==
Craig Stewart, who also worked for South by Southwest, was inducted into the Austin Music Industry Hall of Fame in 2018; the induction introduction noted that Emperor Jones acts owned their master recordings and were free to sign other deals. He died in December 2023 at the age of 53. According to the Chronicle, the cause was complications from COVID-19 and dementia.

== See also ==
- List of record labels
