= 1992 in New Zealand =

- Decades: 1970s; 1980s; 1990s; 2000s; 2010s
- See also: History of New Zealand; List of years in New Zealand; Timeline of New Zealand history

The following lists events that happened during 1992 in New Zealand.

== Population ==
- Estimated population as of 31 December: 3,552,200.
- Increase since 31 December 1991: 37,200 (1.06%).
- Males per 100 females: 97.0.

== Incumbents ==
=== Regal and viceregal ===
- Head of State – Elizabeth II
- Governor-General – The Hon Dame Catherine Anne Tizard, GCMG, GCVO, DBE, QSO

=== Government ===
The 43rd New Zealand Parliament continued. Government was The National Party, led by Jim Bolger. National controlled nearly seventy percent of the seats in Parliament.

- Speaker of the House – Robin Gray
- Prime Minister – Jim Bolger
- Deputy Prime Minister – Don McKinnon
- Minister of Finance – Ruth Richardson
- Minister of Foreign Affairs – Don McKinnon
- Chief Justice — Sir Thomas Eichelbaum

=== Parliamentary opposition ===
- Leader of the Opposition – Mike Moore (Labour).
- Alliance – Jim Anderton

=== Main centre leaders ===
- Mayor of Auckland – Les Mills
- Mayor of Hamilton – Margaret Evans
- Mayor of Wellington – Jim Belich then Fran Wilde
- Mayor of Christchurch – Vicki Buck
- Mayor of Dunedin – Richard Walls

== Events ==
- 6 February – Ruby Jubilee of Elizabeth II's accession as Queen of New Zealand
- 15 June – A by-election is held in the Tamaki electorate after the resignation of former Prime Minister Robert Muldoon. Clem Simich wins the seat and retains it for the National Party.
- 22 August – New Zealand Phone Number Update: Christchurch completes its switch to seven-digit local telephone numbers.
- 28 August – Canterbury experiences "The Big Snow", its heaviest snowstorm in 30 years. The storm causes widespread disruption across the region and the deaths of an estimated one million sheep.
- 19 September – An indicative referendum on the voting system is held, with 85% of voters voting to change from the existing First Past the Post system, and 70% voting for Mixed Member Proportional as the replacement system.
- 27 October – New Zealand is elected to the United Nations Security Council for two years (1993–94) on the third ballot
- 12 December – A by-election is held in the Wellington Central electorate after Fran Wilde resigns to become Mayor of Wellington. Chris Laidlaw wins the seat and retains it for the Labour Party.
- The country experiences an electricity crisis after drought conditions result in low South Island hydro lake levels.
- Kapiti Marine Reserve is established

== Arts and literature ==
- Owen Marshall wins the Robert Burns Fellowship.

See 1992 in art, 1992 in literature, Category:1992 books

=== Music ===
==== New Zealand Music Awards ====
Winners are shown first with nominees underneath.

- Album of the Year: Headless Chickens – Body Blow
  - Midge Marsden – Burning Rain
  - MC OJ & The Rhythm Slave – What Can We Say
- Single of the Year: The Exponents – Why Does Love Do This To Me
  - Headless Chickens – Cruise Control
  - Push Push – Trippin
- Best Male Vocalist: Jordan Luck – (The Exponents)
  - Mikey Havoc (Push Push)
  - Shayne Carter (Straitjacket Fits)
- Best Female Vocalist: Fiona McDonald – (Headless Chickens)
  - Moana
  - Ngaire
- Best Group: Push Push
  - The Exponents
  - Headless Chickens
- Most Promising Male Vocalist: David Parker – (Parker Project)
  - Jon Toogood (Shihad)
  - James Gaylyn
- Most Promising Female Vocalist: Teremoana Rapley – (Moana & the Moahunters)
  - Christina Fuemana (House Party)
  - Lorina Harding
- Most Promising Group: Shihad
  - The Exponents
  - These Wilding Ways
- International Achievement: Crowded House
  - Jenny Morris
  - Straitjacket Fits
- Best Video: Mauger Bros – Trippin' (Push Push)
  - Moana & The Moahunters – AEIOU
  - Headless Chickens – Cruise Control
- Best Producer: Steve Garden – Burning Rain (Midge Marsden)
  - Rex Visible/ Headless Chickens – Body Blow
  - Carl Doy – Standing Ovation
- Best Engineer: Nick Morgan – Burning Rain (Midge Marsden)
  - Tony Moan /Steve Smith – World Gone Wild
  - Ian Morris/ Tim Farrant – What's The Time Mr Wolf
- Best Jazz Album: Various / Broadbent / Chisholm / Gibson / Brown – Fine & Dandy
  - Nairobi Trio – Nairobi Trio
  - Liz Braggins – Liz Braggins
- Best Classical Album: Mcintyre / Doig / Marc – Wagner
  - Dorian Choir – Images of Light
  - Viva Voce – Sounds & Sweet Airs
- Best Folk Album: Lorina Harding – Lucky Damn Woman
  - Angela Dixon – Takin A Chance
  - Martin Curtis – The Daisy Patch
- Best Country Album: John Grenell – Windstar
  - Barbie Davidson – Borderline
  - Renderers – Trail of Tears
- Best Gospel Album: Pacific Island Choir – O Mai Ia Ia Iesu
  - Congregational Christian Church – Oe Le Faitoaga Moi
  - Ambassador Gospel Singers – Hear The Call
- Best Polynesian Album: Charles & Andre – CÉst Toi Ma Vie
  - The Five Stars – Children of Polynesia
  - Tumuenua Dance Group – Drums, Songs And Chants
- Best Māori Album: Moana & The Moahunters – AEIOU
  - John Rowles – E Te Tamaiti
  - The Whanau Funksters – Funky Whanau Feeling
- Best Songwriter: Neil Finn – Fall at Your Feet (Crowded House)
  - Jordan Luck – Why Does Love Do This To Me
  - Neil & Tim Finn – It's Only Natural
- Best Cover: Hamish Kilgour – Pink Flying Saucers Over The Southern Alps (Various Artists)
  - Richard Gourley -'Hold Onto Your Face
  - Dick Frizzell -What Can We Say?

See: 1992 in music

=== Performing arts ===
- Benny Award presented by the Variety Artists Club of New Zealand to Carl Doy ONZM.

=== Radio and television ===
- 25 May: Shortland Street first airs.

See: 1992 in New Zealand television, 1992 in television, List of TVNZ television programming, Category:Television in New Zealand, TV3 (New Zealand), Category:New Zealand television shows, Public broadcasting in New Zealand

=== Film ===
- Alex
- Braindead

See: Category:1992 film awards, 1992 in film, List of New Zealand feature films, Cinema of New Zealand, Category:1992 films

=== Internet ===
See: NZ Internet History

== Sport ==
=== Athletics ===
- Mark Hutchinson wins his first national title in the men's marathon, clocking 2:16:32 on 25 October in Auckland, while Lee-Ann McPhillips claims her second in the women's championship (2:40:00).

=== Horse racing ===
==== Harness racing ====
- New Zealand Trotting Cup: Blossom Lady
- Auckland Trotting Cup: Master Musician

=== Olympic Games ===
==== Summer Olympics ====
- New Zealand sends a team of 134 competitors in 17 sports.

Gold	Silver	Bronze	Total
1	4	5	10

==== Winter Olympics ====
- New Zealand sends a team of nine competitors across three sports.
- Annelise Coberger wins New Zealand's first Winter Olympics medal.

Gold	Silver	Bronze	Total
0	1	0	1

=== Paralympic Games ===
==== Summer Paralympics ====
- New Zealand sends a team of 13 competitors.

Gold	Silver	Bronze	Total
5	1	0	6

==== Winter Paralympics ====
- New Zealand sends a team of seven competitors in one sport.

Gold	Silver	Bronze	Total
2	0	0	2

=== Shooting ===
- Ballinger Belt –
  - Micheil Sweet (Australia)
  - Diane Collings (Te Puke), sixth, top New Zealander

=== Soccer ===
- The Chatham Cup is won by Miramar Rangers who beat Waikato United 3–1 in the final.

== Births ==
=== January ===
- 1 January
  - Dane Cleaver, cricketer
  - Aaron James Murphy, actor
  - Nathaniel Peteru, rugby league player
- 3 January
  - Scott Kuggeleijn, cricketer
  - Daniel McLay, racing cyclist
  - Sio Siua Taukeiaho, rugby league player
- 5 January
  - Abby Damen, actor
  - Hagen Schulte, rugby union player
- 6 January – James McDonald, jockey
- 7 January – Tohu Harris, rugby league player
- 9 January – Joseph Parker, boxer
- 10 January – Carlos Tuimavave, rugby league player
- 12 January – Cole McConchie, cricketer
- 13 January – Sam Cane, rugby union player
- 14 January – Te Paea Selby-Rickit, netball player
- 15 January
  - Matthew Stanley, swimmer
  - Chris Ulugia, rugby league player
- 16 January – Ihaia West, rugby union player
- 17 January – Craig Cachopa, cricketer
- 21 January – Gafatasi Su'a, rugby union player
- 23 January – TJ Perenara, rugby union player
- 24 January – Christian Lloyd, rugby union player
- 29 January – Jordan Taufua, rugby union player

=== February ===
- 1 February
  - Christian Huriwai, unicyclist
- 3 February – Bryn Hall, rugby union player
- 4 February – Kayla Imrie, canoeist
- 5 February – Mitchell Santner, cricketer
- 9 February – Caitlin Ryan, canoeist
- 11 February – Ope Peleseuma, rugby union player
- 13 February – Kayla Cullen, netball player
- 14 February – Paterika Vaivai, rugby league player
- 15 February – Leigh Kasperek, cricketer
- 18 February – Matt Taylor, cricketer
- 23 February – Jamison Gibson-Park, rugby union player
- 24 February – Bevan Small, cricketer
- 25 February – Rose Matafeo, comedian, television presenter
- 26 February – Michael Chee Kam, rugby league player

=== March ===
- 1 March – Tom Walsh, athlete
- 4 March – Omar Slaimankhel, rugby union and rugby league player
- 8 March – Nathan Harris, rugby union player
- 14 March – Joe Wright, rower
- 16 March
  - Olivia Merry, field hockey player
  - Siate Tokolahi, rugby union player
- 17 March – Jake Heenan, rugby union player
- 19 March
  - Alex Maloney, sailor
  - Api Pewhairangi, rugby league player
- 25 March – Mosese Fotuaika, rugby league player
- 29 March – Morgan Figgins, figure skater

=== April ===
- 1 April
  - Alex Gilbert, adoption advocate
  - James Musa, association footballer
  - Adam Thomas, association footballer
- 2 April – Tom Latham, cricketer
- 3 April – Byron Wells, freestyle skier
- 4 April – Reggie Goodes, rugby union player
- 6 April – Francie Turner, rowing coxswain
- 7 April
  - Sitaleki Akauola, rugby league player
  - Joe Latta, rugby union player
- 9 April – Anna Willcox-Silfverberg, freestyle skier
- 13 April – Adam Milne, cricketer
- 17 April
  - Ambrose Curtis, rugby union player
  - Erin Nayler, association footballer
- 19 April - Ofa Tu'ungafasi, rugby union player
- 20 April – Sauaso Sue, rugby league player
- 28 April – Lakyn Heperi, musician

=== May ===
- 3 May – Will Skelton, rugby union player
- 8 May – Wayne Ulugia, rugby league player
- 9 May – Paul Coll, squash player
- 10 May – Malakai Fekitoa, rugby union player
- 13 May – Josh Papalii, rugby league player
- 19 May
  - Kwabena Appiah, association footballer
  - Felise Kaufusi, rugby league player
- 24 May
  - Ethan Rusbatch, basketball player
  - Jack Whetton, rugby union player
- 26 May
  - Isaac Grainger, rower
  - Curtis Rona, rugby league player
- 27 May - Ollie Pringle, cricketer
- 28 May - Hannah Wilkinson, association footballer

=== June ===
- 5 June – Tupou Sopoaga, rugby league player
- 6 June – Nela Zisser, model
- 8 June – Sean Lovemore, association footballer
- 14 June – Penani Manumalealii, rugby league player
- 30 June
  - Tom Doyle, association footballer
  - Grace Prendergast, rower

=== July ===
- 3 July – Ryan Cocker, rugby union player
- 4 July – Brooke Neal, field hockey player
- 5 July – Felicity Milovanovich, actor
- 8 July – James Lowe, rugby union player
- 16 July – Gerard Cowley-Tuioti, rugby union player
- 23 July – Seta Tamanivalu, rugby union player
- 24 July – Shaun Kirkham, rower
- 26 July – Samantha Lucie-Smith, swimmer
- 30 July – Adam Barwood, alpine skier
- 31 July – John Palavi, rugby league player

=== August ===
- 6 August – Hamish Northcott, rugby union player
- 7 August – Albert Nikoro, rugby union player
- 8 August – Jimmy Tupou, rugby union player
- 14 August
  - Liam Graham, association footballer
  - Marty McKenzie, rugby union player
- 17 August - Alex Elisala, rugby league player
- 20 August – Sulu Tone-Fitzpatrick, netball player
- 24 August – James Hunter, rower
- 28 August – Willis Feasey, alpine skier

=== September ===
- 3 September – Michael Davidson, cricketer
- 4 September – Princess Chelsea, musician
- 5 September – Teimana Harrison, rugby union player
- 6 September – Joe Walker, cricketer
- 10 September – Hugh Blake, rugby union player
- 14 September – Michael Fatialofa, rugby union player
- 21 September – Avalon Biddle, motorcycle racer
- 24 September
  - Pita Ahki, rugby union player
  - Darcina Manuel, judoka
- 27 September – Eve MacFarlane, rower

=== October ===
- 7 October – Hayley Jensen, cricketer
- 8 October – Octagonal, thoroughbred racehorse
- 9 October – Jay White, professional wrestler
- 11 October – Ligi Sao, rugby league player
- 12 October – Rhys Marshall, rugby union player
- 13 October – Alex Kennedy, rower
- 19 October – Scott Eade, rugby union player
- 20 October – Maddy Green, cricketer
- 21 October – Aaron Barclay, triathlete
- 22 October – Nathan Flannery, rower
- 24 October – Roysyn, thoroughbred racehorse
- 26 October
  - Matt Proctor, rugby union player
  - Sam Vaka, rugby union player
- 29 October – Eric Sione, rugby union player
- 31 October – Ish Sodhi, cricketer

=== November ===
- 3 November
  - Lance Beddoes, squash player
  - Jamie McDell, singer-songwriter
- 9 November – Bridgette Armstrong, association footballer
- 22 November
  - Natalie Dodd, cricketer
  - Will Young, cricketer

=== December ===
- 4 December – Peta Hiku, rugby league player
- 8 December
  - David Correos, comedian
  - Julia King, field hockey player
- 9 December – Sarah Goss, rugby union player
- 11 December – Megan Craig, squash player
- 12 December – Sophia Fenwick, netball player
- 17 December – Joe Carter, cricketer
- 21 December – Cameron Lindsay, association footballer
- 22 December – Aki Seiuli, rugby union player
- 23 December – Damon Leitch, motor racing driver
- 25 December – Christobelle Grierson-Ryrie, model

=== Exact date unknown ===
- Stevie Tonks, singer

== Deaths ==
=== January–March ===
- 6 January – Steve Gilpin, musician (born 1949)
- 18 January – Desmond O'Donnell, rugby union player (born 1921)
- 20 January – Snow Bowman, rugby union player (born 1915)
- 3 February – Merv Corner, rugby union player, soldier, sports administrator (born 1908)
- 19 February – Sir Gordon Minhinnick, cartoonist (born 1902)
- 25 February – F. Russell Miller, politician (born 1914)
- 9 March – Ethel Gould, politician, MLC (born 1895)
- 13 March – Morgan Moffat, lawn bowls player (born 1943)
- 15 March – Allan Dick, politician (born 1915)

=== April–June ===
- 21 April – Barry Dallas, doctor, politician (born 1926)
- 28 April – Allan Highet, politician (born 1913)
- 2 May –
  - Trevor Hatherton, geophysicist, scientific administrator (born 1924)
  - Kel Tremain, rugby union player (born 1938)
- 9 May – Alex Stenhouse, association footballer (born 1910)
- 23 May – Ernst Plischke, architect (born 1903)
- 29 May – Mavis Rivers, jazz singer (born 1929)
- 4 June – Mortie Foreman, plastics manufacturer (born 1902)
- 5 June – Rangitaamo Takarangi, Māori welfare officer and community leader (born 1901)
- 9 June – Jim Clayton, rower (born 1911)

=== July–September ===
- 4 July – Jimmy James, dancer, dance teacher, cabaret proprietor (born 1915)
- 10 July – Laurie Haig, rugby union player (born 1922)
- 11 July – Douglas St John, cricketer (born 1928)
- 17 July – Frank Haigh, lawyer, social reformer (born 1898)
- 27 July – Audrey Gale, lawyer, politician (born 1909)
- 30 July – John Scott, architect (born 1924)
- July (date unknown) – Mervyn Thompson, playwright, theatre director, drama academic (born 1936)
- 2 August –
  - Alf Cleverley, boxer (born 1907)
  - Roderick Finlayson, writer (born 1904)
- 5 August – Sir Robert Muldoon, politician (born 1921)
- 6 August – Jack Brooke, yachtsman, yacht designer, research engineer (born 1907)
- 14 August – Bill Hamilton, agricultural scientist, scientific administrator (born 1909)
- 15 August – Ronald Moore, soldier (born 1915)
- 29 August - Ian Hamilton, cricketer (born 1906)
- 19 September – Percy Allen, politician (born 1913)

=== October–December ===
- 1 October – Samantha Dubois, radio presenter (born 1955)
- 4 October – Denny Hulme, motor racing driver (born 1936)
- 13 October – Ruth Page, political activist (born 1905)
- 24 October – Oswald Sanders, Christian teacher, missionary and writer (born 1902)
- 6 November – Gordon Innes, rugby union and rugby league player (born 1910)
- 18 November – Ken Gray, rugby union player, politician (born 1938)
- 22 November –
  - Ronald Sinclair, child actor, film editor (born 1924)
  - Sir Gerard Wall, surgeon, politician (born 1920)
- 12 December – Sir Robert Rex, Niuean politician (born 1909)
- 19 December – Eve Sutton, children's author (born 1906)
- 26 December – Eve Poole, Mayor of Invercargill (born 1924)
- 28 December – Paul Beadle, sculptor and medallist (born 1917)
- 29 December – Avice Bowbyes, home science academic (born 1901)
- 31 December – Sir Denis Barnett, air force officer (born 1906)

== See also ==
- List of years in New Zealand
- Timeline of New Zealand history
- History of New Zealand
- Military history of New Zealand
- Timeline of the New Zealand environment
- Timeline of New Zealand's links with Antarctica
