= 1994 in New Zealand =

- Decades: 1970s; 1980s; 1990s; 2000s; 2010s
- See also: History of New Zealand; List of years in New Zealand; Timeline of New Zealand history

The following lists events that happened during 1994 in New Zealand.

== Population ==
- Estimated population as of 31 December: 3,648,300.
- Increase since 31 December 1993: 50,400 (1.40%).
- Males per 100 Females: 97.2.

== Incumbents ==
=== Regal and viceregal ===
- Head of State – Elizabeth II
- Governor-General – The Hon Dame Catherine Tizard, GCMG, GCVO, DBE, QSO

=== Government ===
The 44th New Zealand Parliament continued. Government was The National Party, led by Jim Bolger.

- Speaker of the House – Peter Tapsell
- Prime Minister – Jim Bolger
- Deputy Prime Minister – Don McKinnon
- Minister of Finance – Bill Birch
- Minister of Foreign Affairs – Don McKinnon
- Chief Justice — Sir Thomas Eichelbaum

=== Opposition leaders ===
See: Category:Parliament of New Zealand, New Zealand elections

- Act – Roger Douglas
- New Zealand First – Winston Peters
- United Future – TBD
- Labour – Helen Clark (Leader of the Opposition)
- Progressives – TBD

=== Main centre leaders ===
- Mayor of Auckland – Les Mills
- Mayor of Hamilton – Margaret Evans
- Mayor of Wellington – Fran Wilde
- Mayor of Christchurch – Vicki Buck
- Mayor of Dunedin – Richard Walls

== Events ==
- 8 February: A fire on Ridgway Street in Whanganui destroys six heritage buildings.
- 18 June: A magnitude 6.7 earthquake strikes 5 kilometres south-west of Arthur's Pass, Canterbury.
- 20 June: Robin and Margaret Bain and three of their four children – Arawa, Laniet, and Stephen – were shot to death in Dunedin. The Bain Family Murder case has been described as "the most widely discussed and divisive in New Zealand's criminal history".
- 13 August: By-election in Selwyn after the National MP Ruth Richardson retired from politics. David Carter retained the seat for National.
- 17 September: Anne-Maree Ellens was murdered in Christchurch. Michael October (he later changed his name to Mikaere Oketopa) was later convicted of murdering her. The Criminal Cases Review Commission sent the case back to the Court of Appeal of New Zealand in 2023 for it to be reconsidered over "strong concerns with the police investigation, and his convictions".
- October: Māori activist Mike Smith attempts to cut down the tree on Auckland's Maungakiekie / One Tree Hill as a protest against government economic policies.

== Arts and literature ==
- Christine Johnston wins the Robert Burns Fellowship

See 1994 in art, 1994 in literature, Category:1994 books

=== Music ===
==== New Zealand Music Awards ====
Winners are shown first with nominees underneath.

- Album of the Year: Straitjacket Fits – Blow
  - Strawpeople – World Service
  - The 3Ds – Venus Trail
- Single of the Year: Headless Chickens – Juice / Chopper
  - Strawpeople – Love Explodes
  - Straitjacket Fits – Cat Inna Can
- Best Male Vocalist: Shayne Carter (Straitjacket Fits)
  - Jon Toogood (Shihad)
  - Chris Matthews
- Best Female Vocalist: Fiona McDonald (Headless Chickens)
  - Annie Crummer
  - Shona Laing
- Best Group: Headless Chickens
  - Strawpeople
  - Straitjacket Fits
- Most Promising Male Vocalist: Matty J (Matty J and the Soul Syndicate)
  - Michael Gregg & Brendan Gregg
  - Jason Ioasa
- Most Promising Female Vocalist: Emma Paki
  - Jan Preston
  - Rima Te Wiata
- Most Promising Group: Urban Disturbance
  - Holy Toledos
  - 3Ds
- International Achievement: Crowded House
  - Straitjacket Fits
  - Headless Chickens
- Best Video: Matt Noonan / Josh Frizzell – System Virtue (Emma Paki)
  - Fane Flaws – The Beautiful Things (Front Lawn)
  - Johnny Ogilvie – Mr Moon (Headless Chickens)
- Best Producer: Strawpeople – World Service
  - Stuart Pearce – Pacifico (Kantuta)
  - Jaz Coleman – Churn (Shihad)
- Best Engineer: Malcolm Welsford – Churn (Shihad)
  - Malcolm Wellsford – You Gotta Know (Supergroove)
  - Graeme Myhre – Travellin' On (Midge Marsden)
- Best Jazz Album: Freebass – Raw
  - Bluespeak – Late Last Night
  - Nairobi Trio – Through The Clouds
- Best Classical Album: Dame Malvina Major – Casta Diva
  - NZ Symphony Orchestra – The Three Symphonies/ Douglas Lilburn
  - Tamas Vesmas – Eastern European Piano Music
- Best Country Album: Al Hunter – The Singer
  - The Warratahs – Big Sky
  - Patsy Riggir – My Little Corner of the World
- Best Folk Album: Steve McDonald – Sons of Somerled
  - Adam Bell – Summerland
  - Beverly Young – It's Then I Wish
- Best Gospel Album: Stephen Bell-Booth – Undivided
  - Woodford House Chapel Choir – Celebration
  - Monica O'Hagan – His Love
  - Andrew & Saskia Smith – The Gemcutter
- Polynesian Album of the Year: Pasifik MX – Manuiri
  - Andre Tapena – It's Raro
  - Mana – Mana
- Best Songwriter: Emma Paki – System Virtue
  - Stephen Bell-Booth – Undivided
  - Greg Johnson – Winter Song
- Best Cover: Brett Graham – Te Rangatahi
  - Johnny Pain & Jonathan King – Drinking With Judas (Hallelujah Picassos)
  - Chris Knox – Duck Shaped Pain and Gum

See: 1994 in music

=== Radio and television ===
- 4 March: Australian police drama Blue Heelers comes to New Zealand when the series begins screening on TV One.
- 4 April: US children's television series Barney & Friends first airs on TV2.
- 27 April: US science fiction drama The X-Files makes its New Zealand television debut on TV2.
- 19 July: Australian children's cartoon series The Adventures of Blinky Bill begins airing on TV2 in New Zealand (the same country where the author of the books Dorothy Wall was born).
- 4 September: British children's animation based on the books by Sarah Ferguson Budgie the Little Helicopter appears on New Zealand television screens for the first time on TV3. It was also the first British cartoon to air on TV3 as well as making the New Zealand the first country outside of the UK to broadcast it.
- 8 September: Acclaimed British children's television series Thomas the Tank Engine and Friends screens on TV2 as a stand alone for the very last time.
- 19 October: The last broadcast of Goodnight Kiwi on TV2.
- 3 December: Orange, a brand new general entertainment channel is launched by Sky.
- 3 December: Long running children's Saturday morning series What Now has its final broadcast for 1994 on TV2.
- TV 2 begins 24-hour/7-day programming.
- Newstalk ZB begins broadcasting nationwide.
- The Classic Hits brand is rolled out nationwide when heritage stations operated by Radio New Zealand are rebranded as Classic Hits originally retaining local programming.

See: List of TVNZ television programming, TV3 (New Zealand), Public broadcasting in New Zealand

=== Film ===
- Bread and Roses
- Heavenly Creatures
- Once Were Warriors

See: Category:1994 film awards, 1994 in film, List of New Zealand feature films, Cinema of New Zealand, Category:1994 films

=== Internet ===
See: NZ Internet History

== Sport ==
=== Athletics ===
- Paul Smith wins his first national title in the men's marathon, clocking 2:19:12 on 30 April in Rotorua, while Nyla Carroll claims her first in the women's championship (2:37:37).

=== Basketball ===
- The NBL was won by Nelson

=== Commonwealth Games ===
Gold	Silver	Bronze	Total
5	16	20	41

=== Cricket ===
Various Tours, New Zealand cricket team, Chappell–Hadlee Trophy, Cricket World Cup

=== Golf ===
New Zealand Open, Check Category:New Zealand golfers in overseas tournaments.

=== Horse racing ===
==== Harness racing ====
- New Zealand Trotting Cup: Bee Bee Cee
- Auckland Trotting Cup: Chokin – 2nd win

==== Thoroughbred racing ====
- Netball: Silver Ferns, National Bank Cup, Netball World Championships

=== Olympic Games ===
- New Zealand sends a team of seven competitors in two sports.

Gold	Silver	Bronze	Total
0	0	0	0

=== Paralympic Games ===
- New Zealand sends a team of seven competitors in one sport.

Gold	Silver	Bronze	Total
3	0	3	6

=== Rugby league ===
- The Lion Red Cup competition was introduced, with 12 teams participating. The Counties Manukau Heroes were the Minor Premiers, but were beaten 24–16 in the Grand Final by the North Harbour Sea Eagles.
- Canterbury rugby league team retained the Rugby League Cup throughout the season.
- 16 October, New Zealand defeated Papua New Guinea 28-12
- 27 October, New Zealand defeated Papua New Guinea 30-16

=== Rugby union ===
Category:Rugby union in New Zealand, Rugby World Cup, National Provincial Championship, Category:All Blacks, Bledisloe Cup, Tri Nations Series, Ranfurly Shield

=== Shooting ===
- Ballinger Belt –
  - Andy Luckman (United Kingdom)
  - John Whiteman (Upper Hutt), sixth, top New Zealander

=== Soccer ===
- The Superclub competition was won by North Shore United
- The Chatham Cup is won by Waitakere City who beat Wellington Olympic 1–0 in the final.

== Births ==
=== January ===
- 1 January – Hayden McCormick, cyclist
- 6 January – Samantha McClung, beauty pageant contestant
- 7 January – Gemma Jones, sailor
- 10 January – Tim Payne, association football player
- 12 January – Simon Hickey, rugby union player
- 17 January – Chance Peni, rugby league player
- 20 January – Caitlin Lopes Da Silva, water polo player
- 23 January – Hamish Schreurs, cyclist
- 31 January
  - Georgia Fabish, actor
  - Rose Keddell, field hockey player

=== February ===
- 5 February
  - Lewis Ormond, rugby union player
  - Tom Sanders, rugby union player
- 15 February – Mitchell Drummond, rugby union player
- 18 February – Patrick Kaufusi, rugby league player
- 19 February
  - Sam Lisone, rugby league player
  - Brook Robertson, rower
- 23 February – Patrice Siolo, rugby league player

=== March ===
- 1 March – Siositina Hakeai, discus thrower
- 4 March – Max O'Dowd, cricketer
- 7 March – Ruby Tew, rower
- 15 March – Kip Colvey, association footballer

=== April ===
- 3 April – Kodi Nikorima, rugby league player
- 5 April
  - Sam Bosworth, coxswain
  - Tom Murray, rower
- 12 April – Holly Moon, gymnast
- 14 April – Beau Monga, singer and beatboxer
- 15 April – Katie Bowen, association footballer
- 16 April – Holly Patterson, association footballer
- 20 April – Tyrell Baringer-Tahiri, association footballer

=== May ===
- 4 May – Joseph Tapine, rugby league player
- 8 May – Luke Adams, association footballer
- 9 May – Epalahame Faiva, rugby union player
- 25 May
  - Richie Mo'unga, rugby union player
  - Josh Renton, rugby union player
- 29 May – Tai Webster, basketball player

=== June ===
- 7 June – Miranda Chase, water polo player
- 13 June – Liam Dudding, cricketer
- 22 June – Felicity Leydon-Davis, cricketer
- 24 June – Mitch Evans, motor racing driver

=== July ===
- 1 July – Tyla Nathan-Wong, rugby sevens and touch player
- 6 July – Tayla O'Brien, association footballer
- 16 July – Ken Maumalo, rugby league player
- 23 July
  - Selina Goddard, lawn bowler
  - Thomas Kingsmill, water polo player
- 25 July – Sophie Cocks, field hockey player

=== August ===
- 2 August
  - Manaia Cherrington, rugby league player
  - Jacob Duffy, cricketer
- 5 August – James Tucker, rugby union player
- 7 August – Regan Ware, rugby union player
- 11 August
  - Anton Cooper, cross-country cyclist
  - Kelsey Smith, field hockey player
- 12 August – Trent Jones, BMX cyclist
- 18 August – Ashleigh Ward, association footballer
- 19 August – Nick Cassidy, motor racing driver

=== September ===
- 3 September – Francis Molo, rugby league player
- 7 September
  - Herman Ese'ese, rugby league player
  - Matt Vaega, rugby union player
- 8 September – Leon Fukofuka, rugby union player
- 12 September – Robert O'Donnell, cricketer
- 14 September – Jamie Booth, rugby union player
- 19 September – Matthew Hutchins, swimmer
- 23 September – Malia Paseka, netball player
- 26 September – Emma Robinson, swimmer

=== October ===
- 1 October – Harshae Raniga, association footballer
- 2 October – Trinity Spooner-Neera, rugby union player
- 8 October – Jahrome Hughes, rugby league player
- 10 October – Anna Tempero, gymnast
- 16 October – David Fusitu'a, rugby league player
- 22 October – Michael Brake, rower
- 25 October – Ken McClure, cricketer
- 27 October – Stephanie Skilton, association footballer
- 31 October – Matthew Lewis, water polo player

=== November ===
- 6 November – Christian Cullen, standardbred racehorse
- 18 November – Anna-Lisa Christiane, beauty pageant contestant
- 22 November – Tautalatasi Tasi, rugby league player
- 23 November – Evie Millynn, association footballer
- 24 November – Brew, Thoroughbred racehorse
- 27 November
  - Racquel Sheath, cyclist
  - Shrek, celebrity sheep

=== December ===
- 2 December – Rachel Schmidt, trampolinist
- 5 December – Zonda, Thoroughbred racehorse
- 8 December
  - Helena Gasson, swimmer
  - Dylan Kennett, cyclist
  - Elizabeth Thompson, field hockey player
- 10 December
  - Leo Carter, cricketer
  - Holly Robinson, athlete
- 14 December – Tim Seifert, cricketer
- 16 December – Jordan Rae, gymnast
- 17 December – Lloyd Perrett, rugby league player
- 20 December
  - Jacko Gill, shot putter
  - Ryan Thomas, association football player
- 22 December
  - Lalakai Foketi, rugby union player
  - Cameron Howieson, association football player
- 23 December – David Havili, rugby union player
- 24 December – Fa'amanu Brown, rugby league player
- 30 December
  - Tyler Boyd, association football player
  - Kyle Jamieson, cricketer

=== Full date unknown ===
- Kylie Price, singer-songwriter

== Deaths ==
=== January–March ===
- 1 January – Arthur Porritt, Baron Porritt, 11th Governor-General of New Zealand (born 1900)
- 2 January – Godfrey Bowen, sheep shearer (born 1922)
- 4 January – Dame Eileen Mayo, artist and designer (born 1906)
- 7 January – Dame Dorothea Horsman, women's rights advocate (born 1918)
- 18 January – Hēmi Pōtatau, Presbyterian minister, soldier, writer (born 1904)
- 25 January – Bertha Rawlinson, operatic singer, actor, composer (born 1910)
- 16 February – Graeme Caughley, population ecologist and conservation biologist (born 1937)
- 4 March – George Hughes, philosopher and logician (born 1918)
- 10 March – D. J. M. Mackenzie, colonial medical officer (born 1905)
- 20 March – John Kennedy, Roman Catholic journalist and editor (born 1926)
- 26 March – Dame Whina Cooper, Māori leader (born 1895)

=== April–June ===
- 17 April – Bill Dillon, politician (born 1933)
- 30 April – Ina Lamason, cricketer and field hockey player (born 1911)
- 2 May – Roderick Syme, agricultural instructor, mountaineer, local-body politician (born 1900)
- 3 May – Francis Bell, actor (born 1944)
- 5 May – Charles Diver, confectioner (born 1910)
- 7 May – Nassipour, Thoroughbred racehorse (foaled 1980)
- 9 May – Connie Birchfield, political activist (born 1898)
- 16 May – Roy McElroy, politician, mayor of Auckland (1965–68) (born 1907)
- 18 May
  - Sir Harry Barker, newspaper journalist, politician (born 1898)
  - Charles Turner, mechanical and civil engineer (born 1901)
- 22 May – Norman Read, racewalker (born 1931)
- 25 May – Jack Best, rugby union player (born 1914)
- 27 May
  - James McHaffie, cricketer (born 1910)
  - Bert Roth, librarian, historian (born 1917)
- 31 May
  - Philip Blakeley, electrical engineer (born 1915)
  - Cedric Firth, architect, writer (born 1908)
  - Doug Freeman, cricketer (born 1914)
- 1 June – Bramwell Cook, Salvation Army leader, doctor (born 1903)
- 3 June – Jack Cowie, cricketer (born 1912)
- 7 June – Peter Jones, rugby union player (born 1932)
- 16 June – Stephen Scott, rugby union player (born 1955)
- 19 June – Florence Harsant, temperance worker, writer (born 1891)
- 27 June – Dame Louise Henderson, painter (born 1902)

=== July–September ===
- 3 July – Felix Kelly, designer, painter and illustrator (born 1914)
- 13 July – Richard B. Sibson, ornithologist (born 1911)
- 19 July – Jim Bellwood, physical education teacher, sports coach (born 1912)
- 25 July – Jay Epae, singer and songwriter (born 1933)
- 29 July – Wiremu Te Āwhitu, Roman Catholic priest (born 1914)
- 9 August – Charles Saunders, rower (born 1902)
- 17 August
  - Len Newell, swimmer (born 1913)
  - Dick Shortt, cricket umpire (born 1922)
  - Sir Fred White, physicist, ornithologist, science administrator (born 1905)
- 19 August – Harry Jacks, soldier, plant pathologist, forester (born 1908)
- 22 August – Sir Ralph Love, public servant, politician, Te Āti Awa leader (born 1907)
- 24 August – Cecil Holmes, film director (born 1921)
- 5 September
  - Kathleen Curtis, Lady Rigg, mycologist (born 1892)
  - Mick Williment, rugby union player (born 1940)
- 6 September – Edward Gaines, Roman Catholic bishop (born 1926)
- 12 September – John Chewings, politician (born 1920)

=== October–December ===
- 9 October – Bill Fox, politician (born 1899)
- 10 October – Nola Luxford, Hollywood actress (born 1895)
- 15 October – Avis Acres, artist, writer, illustrator, conservationist (born 1910)
- 24 October – Sir Guy Powles, diplomat, Ombudsman (born 1905)
- 26 October
  - Ronald Dobson, rugby union player (born 1923)
  - Pavel Tichý, logician, philosopher and mathematician (born 1936)
- 28 October – Jock Richardson, rugby union player (born 1899)
- 29 October – Gordon Cochrane, pilot (born 1916)
- 2 November – John Nimmo, cricketer (born 1910)
- 16 November – Ponty Reid, rugby union player (born 1929)
- 22 November – Charles Upham, soldier (born 1908)
- 6 December – Laura Ingram, community leader, local-body politician (born 1912)
- 10 December – James Healy, geologist (born 1910)
- 12 December – Frederick Turnovsky, manufacturer, entrepreneur, arts advocate (born 1916)
- 16 December – Les Gandar, politician, diplomat (born 1919)
- 24 December – Louise Sutherland, cyclist (born 1926)
- 26 December – Sybil Lupp, mechanic, motor racing driving, garage proprietor (born 1916)
- 27 December – Jimmy Kemp, cricketer (born 1918)

== See also ==
- List of years in New Zealand
- Timeline of New Zealand history
- History of New Zealand
- Military history of New Zealand
- Timeline of the New Zealand environment
- Timeline of New Zealand's links with Antarctica
