= 1995 in New Zealand =

- Decades: 1970s; 1980s; 1990s; 2000s; 2010s
- See also: History of New Zealand; List of years in New Zealand; Timeline of New Zealand history

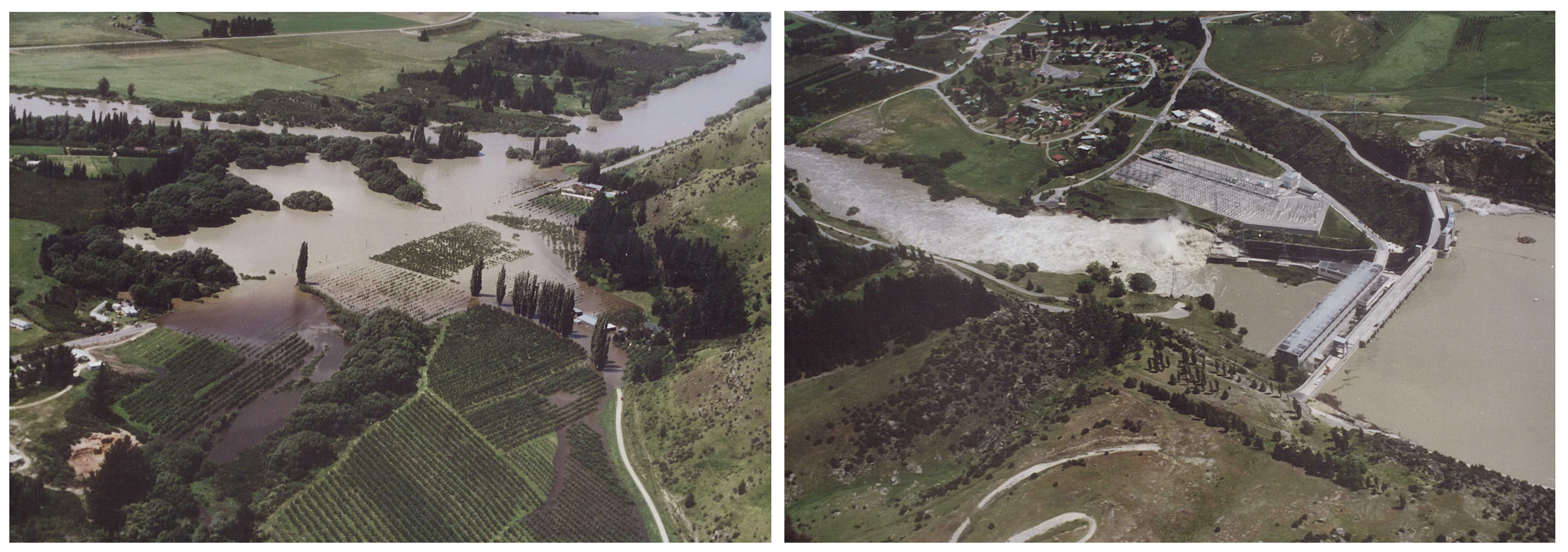
The Clutha River Floods of December 1995 devastated the South Island in New Zealand

The following lists events that happened during 1995 in New Zealand.

== Population ==
- Estimated population as of 31 December: 3,706,700.
- Increase since 31 December 1994: 58,400 (1.60%).
- Males per 100 Females: 97.3.

== Incumbents ==
=== Regal and viceregal ===
- Head of State - Elizabeth II
- Governor-General - The Hon Dame Catherine Tizard, GCMG, GCVO, DBE, QSO

=== Government ===
The 44th New Zealand Parliament continued. Government was The National Party, led by Jim Bolger.

- Speaker of the House - Peter Tapsell
- Prime Minister - Jim Bolger
- Deputy Prime Minister - Don McKinnon
- Minister of Finance - Bill Birch
- Minister of Foreign Affairs - Don McKinnon
- Chief Justice — Sir Thomas Eichelbaum

=== Opposition leaders ===
See: Category:Parliament of New Zealand, New Zealand elections

- Greens - Jeanette Fitzsimons and Rod Donald
- Act - Roger Douglas
- New Zealand First - Winston Peters
- Labour - Helen Clark (Leader of the Opposition)

=== Main centre leaders ===
- Mayor of Auckland - Les Mills
- Mayor of Hamilton - Margaret Evans
- Mayor of Wellington - Fran Wilde then Mark Blumsky
- Mayor of Christchurch - Vicki Buck
- Mayor of Dunedin - Richard Walls then Sukhi Turner

== Events ==
- April: The Cambridge Independent closes. The newspaper began as the Waikato Independent in 1904.
- 28 April: 13 polytech students and a Department of Conservation Worker die when a viewing platform collapses into a 40-metre deep gorge at Cave Creek in the Paparoa National Park.
- 9 June: Ansett Flight 703 crashes on approach to Palmerston North, killing 4 of 21 on board. Passenger Reginald John Dixon was awarded the New Zealand Cross posthumously.
- The Long Bay-Okura and Motu Manawa (Pollen Island) Marine Reserves are established

== Arts and literature ==
- Elspeth Sandys wins the Robert Burns Fellowship.

See 1995 in art, 1995 in literature, Category:1995 books

=== Music ===
==== New Zealand Music Awards ====
Winners are shown first with nominees underneath.

- Album of the Year: Supergroove - Traction
  - The Mutton Birds - Salty
  - Dave Dobbyn - Twist
  - Head Like A Hole - Flik y'self off y'self
  - Shona Laing - Shona
- Single of the Year: Purest Form – Message to My Girl
  - 3 The Hard Way - Hip Hop Holiday
  - Headless Chickens - George
  - Sisters Underground - In The Neighbourhood
  - Supergroove - Can't Get Enough
- Best Male Vocalist: Dave Dobbyn – Twist
  - David Kilgour
  - Greg Johnson
  - Jon Toogood
- Best Female Vocalist: Fiona McDonald
  - Emma Paki
  - Stephanie Tauevihi
- Best Group: Supergroove
  - The Mutton Birds
  - Headless Chickens
- Most Promising Male Vocalist: Brent Milligan (Pumpkinhead)
  - Peter Daube (Bilge Festival)
  - Evan Woodruffe (Melon Twister)
- Most Promising Female Vocalist: Sulata Foai
  - Chloe Reeves
  - Helen Goudge (Melon Twister)
- Most Promising Group: Sisters Underground
  - 3 The Hard Way
  - Purest Form
- International Achievement: Headless Chickens
  - Shihad
  - Crowded House
- Best Video: Jo Fisher & Matt Noonan – "Can't Get Enough" (Supergroove)
  - Johnny Ogilvy - Cruise Control (Headless Chickens)
  - G Keith/ M Ringrose/ S McGlashen - George (Headless Chickens)
- Best Producer: Karl Steven & Malcolm Welsford – Traction (Supergroove)
  - Neil Finn - Twist
  - Neil Finn - Greenstone
- Best Engineer: Malcolm Welsford - Traction (Supergroove)
  - Paul Streekstra - Language
  - Nick Launay - Greenstone
- Best Jazz Album: George Chisholm Quintet - Perfect Strangers
  - John Key - Strange Fruit
  - Urbanism - Urbanism
- Best Classical Album: The NZ Symphony Orchestra - The Three Symphonies / Douglas Lilburn
  - Auckland Philharmonia Orchestra - NZ Music Volume 5
  - Dame Malvina Major - Christmastime
  - The New Zealand National Youth Choir - On Tour in North America '93
- Best Country Album: Kevin Greaves – I'm Not Scared of Women
  - Noel Parlane - Can I Count on You
  - Merv Pinny - Destiny
- Best Folk Album: Windy City Strugglers - Windy City Strugglers
  - Paul Ubana Jones - A Change of Season
  - Chris Priestley - Argentina To Invercargill
- Best Gospel Album: Derek Lind – Stations
  - Sir Howard Morrison - Christmas Collection
  - Jules Riding - The Fisherman
- Best Film Soundtrack: Once Were Warriors
  - Blood Brothers
  - Jesus Christ Superstar
- Best Songwriter: Dave Dobbyn – Language
  - Don McGlashan - Anchor Me
  - Neil Finn - Private Universe
- Best Cover: Alec Bathgate / Chris Knox - 3 EPs (Tall Dwarfs)
  - Wayne Conway - Twist (Dave Dobbyn)
  - Wayne Conway - Broadcast (Strawpeople)
- Lifetime Achievement Award: Ian Magan

See: 1995 in music

=== Performing arts ===
- Benny Award presented by the Variety Artists Club of New Zealand to Guy Cater.

=== Radio and television ===
- 12 February: TV One and TV3 goes 24/7.
- Horizon Pacific is launched, taking over CTV.
- Te Mangai Paho launched.

See: 1995 in New Zealand television, 1995 in television, List of TVNZ television programming, Category:Television in New Zealand, TV3 (New Zealand), Category:New Zealand television shows, Public broadcasting in New Zealand

=== Film ===
- Bonjour Timothy
- Cinema of Unease
- Forgotten Silver

See: Category:1995 film awards, 1995 in film, List of New Zealand feature films, Cinema of New Zealand, Category:1995 films

=== Dance ===
- Black Grace, a modern dance company, is formed in Auckland.

=== Internet ===
See: NZ Internet History

== Sport ==
=== Athletics ===
- Chris Mardon wins his first national title in the men's marathon, clocking 2:24:24 in Christchurch, while Robyn Duncan claims her first in the women's championship (2:57:29).

=== Horse racing ===
==== Harness racing ====
- New Zealand Trotting Cup: Il Vicolo
- Auckland Trotting Cup: Burlington Bertie

=== Rugby league ===
- The Auckland Warriors became the first New Zealand-based team to compete in the Australian Rugby League's premiership. They finished 10th, missing out on the final eight due to being docked two points for an incorrect substitution in one of their games.
- The North Harbour Sea Eagles defended their Lion Red Cup title, defeating the Auckland Warriors colts 28–21 in the final.
- Auckland ended the season holding the Rugby League Cup, after defeating Canterbury.
- 9 June, New Zealand defeated France 22–6.
- 16 June, New Zealand drew with France 16-all.
- 23 June, New Zealand lost to Australia 8-26.
- 7 July, New Zealand lost to Australia 10–20.
- 14 July, New Zealand lost to Australia 10–46.
- New Zealand competed in the 1995 Rugby League World Cup, losing to Australia 30–20 in extra time in the semi-final.

=== Shooting ===
- Ballinger Belt – Ross Geange (Hamilton/Whatawhata)

=== Soccer ===
- The Chatham Cup is won by Waitakere City who beat North Shore United 4–0 in the final.

== Births ==
=== January–February ===
- 1 January – Kurt Heatherley, Australian rules footballer
- 5 January
  - Vince Aso, rugby union player
  - Toafofoa Sipley, rugby league player
- 7 January – Briar Palmer, association footballer
- 9 January – Braden Uele, rugby league player
- 20 January – Duncan Paia'aua, rugby union player
- 23 January
  - Scott Ambrose, cyclist
  - Tuimoala Lolohea, rugby league player
- 24 January – Aimee Fisher, canoeist
- 26 January – Sione Katoa rugby league player
- 6 February – Geoff Cridge, rugby union player
- 7 February – Joel Stevens, association footballer
- 25 February – Theresa Fitzpatrick, rugby union player
- 27 February – Corey Main, swimmer

=== March–April ===
- 8 March – Cameron Skelton, rugby union player
- 13 March – Whenua Patuwai, singer
- 23 March – Tevita Li, rugby union player
- 27 March
  - Te Atawhai Hudson-Wihongi, association footballer
  - Bill Tuiloma, association footballer
- 31 March – Te Toiroa Tahuriorangi, rugby union player
- 10 April – Mitchell Joynt, para athlete
- 11 April
  - Sarah Mason, surfer
  - Erin Routliffe, tennis player
- 15 April – Anton Lienert-Brown, rugby union player
- 19 April – Blake Gibson, rugby union player
- 20 April –
  - Sophia Batchelor, swimmer
  - Damian McKenzie, rugby union player
- 22 April – Catherine Bott, association footballer
- 28 April – Jack Hunter, cricketer

=== May–June ===
- 4 May – Otere Black, rugby union player
- 19 May – Taane Milne, rugby league player
- 2 June – Mitchell Karpik, rugby union player
- 3 June – Thamsyn Newton, cricketer
- 8 June – Andre Heimgartner, motor racing driver
- 12 June – Atunaisa Moli, rugby union player
- 13 June
  - Emily Fanning, tennis player
  - Jack Goodhue, rugby union player
  - Michael Rae, cricketer
- 16 June – Akira Ioane, rugby union player
- 19 June – Mitchell Hunt, rugby union player
- 22 June – Peter Cowan, canoeist
- 30 June – Emma Dyke, rower

=== July–August ===
- 20 July – Moses Leota, rugby league player
- 21 July – Zac Williams, cyclist
- 2 August – Charnze Nicoll-Klokstad, rugby league player
- 5 August – Tim Robertson, orienteering competitor
- 7 August – David Nyika, boxer
- 16 August – Sam Perry, swimmer
- 17 August – Dallin Watene-Zelezniak, rugby league player

=== September–October ===
- 4 September – Jazz Tevaga, rugby league player
- 7 September – Luka Prelevic, association footballer
- 11 September – Willis Meehan, rugby league player
- 15 September – Joe Ofahengaue, rugby league player
- 20 September – Laura Dekker, sailor
- 27 September – Zoe McBride, rower
- 29 September – Sunline, Thoroughbred racehorse (died 2009)
- 2 October
  - Sam Brotherton, association footballer
  - Te Maire Martin, rugby league player
- 6 October – Sam McNicol, rugby union player
- 14 October – Chase Tiatia, rugby union player
- 19 October – Toni Storm, pro wrestler
- 23 October – Sean Wainui, rugby union player (died 2021)
- 25 October – So Casual, Thoroughbred racehorse

=== November–December ===
- 11 November – Josh Aloiai, rugby league player
- 17 November – Beau-James Wells, freestyle skier
- 18 November – Mitchell Dunshea, rugby union player
- 23 November – Bradlee Ashby, swimmer
- 1 December – Lamar Liolevave, rugby league player
- 5 December – Danny Levi, rugby league player
- 12 December – Sam Gaze, cross-country cyclist
- 18 December – Take A Moment, standardbred racehorse

== Deaths ==
=== January–March ===
- 16 January – John Charters, rower (born 1913)
- 20 January – Thomas Arbuthnott, boxer (born 1911)
- 2 February – Kiwi, Thoroughbred racehorse (foaled 1977)
- 12 February – Dorothy Neal White, librarian (born 1915)
- 19 February – Dick Matthews, plant virologist (born 1921)
- 22 February – Ron Hardie, local-body politician (born 1924)
- 23 February – Thing Big, Thoroughbred racehorse (foaled 1970)
- 25 February – John O'Brien, rower (born 1927)
- 8 March – Sir John Ormond, farmer, politician, businessman (born 1905)
- 13 March – Lorelle Corbin, naval officer (born 1916)
- 23 March
  - Eric McCormick, historian, biographer (born 1906)
  - Pat Ralph, marine biology academic (born 1920)
- 24 March – Linden Saunders, music teacher and critic, broadcaster (born 1908)
- 26 March – Winnie Davin, writer, literary editor (born 1909)

=== April–June ===
- 22 April – Henry May, politician (born 1912)
- 1 May – Wynn Abel, businessman, racehorse owner, athlete (born 1911)
- 2 May – James Godwin, military aviator, war crimes investigator (born 1995)
- 9 May – John McIndoe, artist (born 1898)
- 23 May – Edna Pearce, police officer (born 1906)
- 6 June – Sir James Barnes, politician (born 1908)
- 9 June – Gordon Rowe, cricketer (born 1915)
- 10 June – Bruno Lawrence, musician, actor (born 1941)
- 13 June – Patricia Buckfield, paediatrician and neonatologist (born 1934)
- 14 June – Dame Rangimarie Hetet, tohunga raranga (born 1892)
- 16 June – Ron Smith, public servant, communist, peace activist (born 1921)
- 22 June – Spencer Digby, photographer (born 1901)

=== July–September ===
- 2 July – Richard Toy, architect (born 1911)
- 22 July – Jack Bergin, neurologist, anti-abortion campaigner (born 1921)
- 25 July
  - Eddie Isbey, politician (born 1917)
  - Gloria Rawlinson, poet, novelist, short-story writer, editor (born 1918)
- 31 July – Joan Cochran, social reformer, sex educator, teacher (born 1912)
- 1 August – Colin Gray, World War II fighter ace (born 1914)
- 8 August – Dot McNab, military administrator, political organizer (born 1921)
- 13 August – Bruce Grant, alpine skier (born 1963)
- 14 August – Freda White, show-jumper and racehorse trainer (born 1909)
- 25 August – Erich Geiringer, physician, peace activist, writer (born 1917)
- 27 August – Sir Geoffrey Roberts, military aviator and leader, airline manager (born 1906)
- 1 September – Sylvia Chapman, doctor (born 1896)
- 2 September – Ivan Vodanovich, rugby union player, coach and administrator (born 1930)
- 3 September – Sir Lance Adams-Schneider, politician, diplomat (born 1919)
- 5 September
  - John Britten, mechanical engineer, designer (born 1950)
  - Brian Poananga, sportsman, military leader, diplomat (born 1924)
- 11 September – Peter McIntyre, painter and author (born 1910)
- 21 September – Alan Deere, air force pilot (born 1917)
- 24 September – Peter Butler, trade unionist, politician (born 1901)

=== October–December ===
- 15 October – Poul Gnatt, ballet dancer, balletmaster (born 1923)
- 16 October
  - Cam Campion, politician (born 1943)
  - Peter Murdoch, rugby union player (born 1941)
- 23 October – Harold Taylor, mathematician, physicist, university administrator, architectural historian (born 1907)
- 25 October – Noel Crump, swimmer (born 1916)
- 29 October – Fred Gerbic, politician (born 1932)
- 31 October – Sir Wallace (Bill) Rowling, 30th Prime Minister of New Zealand (born 1927)
- 5 November – Gordon Walters, painter (born 1919)
- 13 November – Dale Trendall, classical art historian, university administrator (born 1909)
- 20 November – George Burns, rowing coxswain (born 1919)
- 1 December – Colin Tapley, actor (born 1907)
- 11 December – Euan Robertson, athlete (born 1948)
- 21 December – Charlie Tumahai, musician, songwriter (born 1949)
- 28 December – Kendrick Smithyman, poet (born 1922)

=== Full date unknown ===
- Grant Lingard, artist (born 1961)

== See also ==
- List of years in New Zealand
- Timeline of New Zealand history
- History of New Zealand
- Military history of New Zealand
- Timeline of the New Zealand environment
- Timeline of New Zealand's links with Antarctica
