= Juice (Headless Chickens song) =

1992 single by Headless Chickens

Single by Headless Chickens

from the album Body Blow (re-issue)
- A-side: "Choppers"
- B-side: "Play It Again, Kiri"
- Released: 1992
- Recorded: September 1992
- Studio: Platinum (Melbourne, Australia)
- Length: 4:02
- Label: Flying Nun; Mushroom
- Songwriter(s): Fiona McDonald; Mark Tierney; Paul Casserly
- Producer(s): Michael Koppelman

Headless Chickens singles chronology
"Cruise Control" (1991)	"Juice" (1992)	"Mr. Moon" (1993)

"Juice" is a song by New Zealand rock band Headless Chickens, released as a single in 1992. The track was originally titled "Dreamchild", having been written and performed by Fiona McDonald for Strawpeople. When McDonald later joined the Headless Chickens, the song was reworked and renamed "Juice". It was released as a double A-side with "Choppers" and peaked at number seven on the New Zealand Singles Chart, staying on the chart for 15 weeks. In Australia, the track was voted in at number 44 on the Triple J Hottest 100 of 1993. In 1994, a 12-inch vinyl disc was issued in the United Kingdom featuring two remixes by Ollie J.

== Track listings ==
Australasian CD and cassette single

1. "Juice"
2. "Choppers"
3. "Choppers" (Heli-Bator mix)
4. "Play It Again, Kiri"

UK 12-inch single

A. "Juice" (Ollie J 12-inch mix)
B. "Juice" (Ollie J 12-inch dub original mix)

== Credits and personnel ==
Credits are lifted from the Body Blow album booklet.

Studios

- Recorded at mixed in September 1992 at Platinum Studios (Melbourne, Australia)
- Mastered at Precision Mastering (Los Angeles)

Personnel

- Fiona McDonald – writing, vocals, keyboards
- Mark Tierney – writing
- Paul Casserly – writing
- Chris Matthews – vocals, guitars, keyboards, programs
- Bevan Sweeney – drums, programs
- Michael Lawry – keyboards, programs
- Anthony Nevison – vocals, guitars, bass, keyboards, programs
- Grant Fell – bass, keyboards
- Rex Visible – keyboards, programs
- Angus McNaughton – programs
- Russell "Jimmy" McGregor – strings
- Cate Gray – strings
- Graeme McKean – strings
- Tanya Hardy-Smith – strings
- Michael Koppelman – production, engineering
- Phil "Feel" Jones – assistant engineering

== Charts ==
=== Weekly charts ===
Chart (1993)	Peak position
Australia (ARIA)	104
New Zealand (Recorded Music NZ)	7

=== Year-end charts ===
Chart (1993)	Position
New Zealand (RIANZ)	45
