= A Different Hunger =

Studio album by Fiona McDonald
- Released: 30 September 1999
- Studio: Metropolis (London); York Street; Airforce; Echo (Auckland)
- Genre: Pop rock
- Label: Flying Nun; Mushroom
- Producer: Fiona McDonald; Robin Hancock; Luke Tomes

Singles from A Different Hunger
- 1. "Sin Again" Released: March 1999; 2. "Damage Control" Released: June 1999; 3. "Breathe" Released: 1999; 4. "Bury Me" Released: 1999

A Different Hunger is the only studio album by New Zealand singer-songwriter Fiona McDonald, released on 30 September 1999 by Flying Nun Records and Mushroom Records.

== Background and development ==
Despite having interest in creating a solo album, McDonald had only worked with the bands Strawpeople and The Headless Chickens for the first few years of her career as she felt unprepared to embark on a solo career. However, after earning enough income from a television role, she was able to move into her own home and dedicate more time to writing songs for the project, inspired by introspective songwriters such as PJ Harvey and Elliott Smith.

Much of A Different Hunger was recorded at London's Metropolis Studios. McDonald referred to recording overseas as "incredibly important" as it allowed her to avoid "making a record with inevitable New Zealand limitations in mind," although some parts were recorded in New Zealand at Auckland's York Street, Airforce, and Echo Studios. The album had a number of notable collaborators, including New Zealand musicians Greg Johnson, the Auckland Philharmonia Orchestra, and Jon Toogood and Tom Larkin from Shihad, among others.

The album's title originates from a line in the track "Wish I Was A Man." "George" is a reworked version of the Headless Chickens song that McDonald co-wrote and contributed vocals to in 1994.

== Singles ==
At least four singles were released from A Different Hunger, but only two were commercially successful; "Sin Again," released in March 1999, and "Damage Control," released in June of the same year, which reached No. 7 and No. 18 respectively in the New Zealand charts. "Breathe" and "Bury Me," also released in 1999, failed to chart. "Wish I Was A Man," "Let Me Dream," and "I Don't Care" received funding for music videos but it is unclear if they were ever released as singles.

== Critical reception ==
Professional ratings
Review scores
Source	Rating
AllMusic	2.5/5 stars
The New Zealand Herald	4/5 stars

A Different Hunger received mixed reviews from critics. In a mostly positive review, Russell Baillie, writing for The New Zealand Herald, called it a "sexy pop album." He complimented McDonald's voice and was favourable of the variety of musical styles featured in the album but noted flaws with its cohesiveness and the song "Wish I Was A Man," which he described as "lyrically clumsy." Kelvin Hayes, writing for AllMusic, had a more critical review of the album. He referenced aspects such as the track "Breathe," which he found "odd" and akin to "a cut that didn't make the first Madonna album."

== Track listing ==
Track listing and song credits adapted from Spotify and CD liner notes. All tracks written by Fiona McDonald and produced by McDonald and Robin Hancock, except where noted.

No.	Title	Writer(s)	Producers	Length
1.	"Don't Tell"			3:48
2.	"Sin Again"			4:53
3.	"Let Me Dream"	McDonald; Bevan Larsen	McDonald; Luke Tomes	3:31
4.	"Wish I Was A Man"			3:26
5.	"Blue Nails"			4:46
6.	"George"	McDonald; Grant Fell; Michael Lawry; Chris Matthews; Bevan Sweeney	McDonald; Tomes	4:21
7.	"I Don't Care"			4:03
8.	"Breathe"			3:42
9.	"Bury Me"			4:30
10.	"Strawberry Boy"	McDonald; Nick Roughan		4:37
11.	"Damage Control"			3:25
12.	"Anything"			3:23

== Personnel ==
Credits adapted from CD liner notes.

Musicians

- Fiona McDonald – vocals (all tracks), keyboards (track 3), piano (tracks 6, 11), string arrangements (tracks 2, 3, 6, 8, 10)
- Miranda Adams – strings
- Wayne Bell – drums (track 7), additional drums (tracks 6, 8, 11)
- Christine Bowie – strings
- Chrissy Diamond – backing vocals (track 3), keyboards (tracks 3, 6)
- Neill Duncan – saxophone (track 1)
- Kevin Field – piano (tracks 7, 8), Rhodes piano (track 2)
- Elizebeta Grabczewska – strings
- Artur Grabczewski – strings
- Joel Haines – guitar (tracks 3, 6, 7)
- Kevin Haines – double bass (track 1)
- Robin Hancock – guitar (tracks 4, 11), string arrangement (track 8)
- Jocelyn Healy – strings
- Gordon Hill – strings
- Steve Hilton – programming (tracks 1, 2, 4, 5, 8, 10–12), string arrangements (tracks 2, 5)
- Tony Hopkins – additional drums (track 1), strings
- Greg Johnson – trumpet (track 1)
- Victoria Kelly – keyboards (track 12), conducting, string arrangements (tracks 2, 7, 12)
- Tom Larkin – drums (tracks 2, 4, 9)
- Bevan Larsen – bass (tracks 3, 6, 8, 9), guitar (track 6), acoustic guitar (track 3)
- Ainsly Murray – strings
- Claudia Price – strings
- Anne Rodda – strings
- Nick Roughan – string arrangement (track 10)
- Alexander Shapkin – strings
- Aaron Tokona - guitar (tracks 4, 8, 9)
- Luke Tomes – programming (tracks 3, 6)
- Jon Toogood – guitar (tracks 2, 4, 9)
- Susan Wedde – strings

Technical

- Fiona McDonald – production (all tracks)
- Robin Hancock – production (tracks 1, 2, 4, 5, 7–12), mixing (tracks 1, 2, 4–7, 9–12)
- Luke Tomes – production (tracks 3, 5), mixing (tracks 3, 8)
- Gavin Botica – mastering

== Charts ==
Chart (1999)	Peak position
New Zealand Albums (RMNZ)	8
