= Stunt Clown =

Studio album by Headless Chickens
- Released: 1988
- Recorded: September 1985 – February 1988
- Studio: Mandrill, Auckland
- Genre: Alternative rock
- Label: Flying Nun
- Producer: Rex Vizible; Roland Morris; Headless Chickens; Mark Tierney

Headless Chickens chronology
Headless Chickens (1986)	Stunt Clown (1988)	Body Blow (1991)

Singles from Stunt Clown
- 1. "Expecting to Fly" Released: 1988; 2. "Soulcatcher" Released: 1988

Stunt Clown is the debut full-length studio album by the New Zealand rock band Headless Chickens. The album, released in 1988 through Flying Nun Records, peaked at number 18 in the New Zealand charts. Primarily produced by Rex Vizible and Roland Morris as well as the Headless Chickens themselves, Strawpeople member Mark Tierney also served production duties on the album's bonus tracks. It was reissued in 1995, affixed with the tracks featured in the band's 1986 EP that had previously been included in some international releases of Stunt Clown.

== Background and development ==
In 1986, the Headless Chickens (as Chris Matthews, Johnny Pierce, and Michael Lawry) released their self-titled debut EP, consisting of seven songs. Tragically, Pierce committed suicide shortly afterwards. This resulted in Grant Fell joining the band as the replacement bassist. Around the same time, Rupert E. Taylor and Bevan Sweeney also became part of the band, Taylor as a second vocalist and Sweeney as a drummer. This new line up controversially won the 1987 Rheineck Rock Award, a music award to help develop the careers of upcoming artists. The cause of the controversy was the band's sound being considered too alternative and therefore unprofitable; one journalist writing for Metro magazine wrote that awarding the prize to the Headless Chickens "showed a severe lack of judgement."

Nonetheless, the band continued their ventures. Stunt Clown (excluding the bonus tracks) was recorded at Mandrill Studios in Auckland in January and February 1988 with the assistance of the Rheineck Rock Award prize money. However, there were numerous issues with the development of the album; one of the most major was it going $7,000 over budget, leaving the band members in large amounts of debt. There were also technological issues and conflicts between personnel, including the engineer at Mandrill refusing to communicate with producer Rex Vizible.

== Singles ==
The first two tracks of the album, "Expecting To Fly" and "Soulcatcher," were released as singles in 1988. The album tracks "Do The Headless Chicken" and "Donka" were featured as B-sides. Despite Stunt Clown reaching the top 20 of the New Zealand charts, neither of the singles charted.

== Accolades ==
In April 2018, three decades after its release, Stunt Clown received the Classic Record Award at the Taite Music Prize. Media commentator Russell Brown, who presented the award, described the album as "an ambitious, strikingly varied work" and that "the Taite judges got it right when they chose [Stunt Clown] to honour."

== Track listing ==
No.	Title	Writer(s)	Length
1.	"Expecting to Fly"	Chris Matthews	4:43
2.	"Soulcatcher"	Matthews	5:20
3.	"Frank"	Matthews	2:11
4.	"Do the Headless Chicken"	Matthews	6:52
5.	"Fish Song"	Rupert E. Taylor	2:58
6.	"Donka"	Matthews; Johnny Pierce; Michael Lawry	5:00
7.	"Run, Sheep Run"	Matthews	4:05
8.	"White Out"	Matthews; Grant Fell; Lawry	4:24
9.	"Untitled"	Matthews	2:11
10.	"Cyclic"	Matthews; Pierce; Lawry	2:48
11.	"Star at Night"	Bevan Sweeney; Matthews; Fell; Lawry	4:03
Total length:			44:35

Europe and 1995 reissue bonus tracks (from 1986 Headless Chickens EP)
No.	Title	Writer(s)	Length
12.	"Monkey Jar"	Matthews	5:31
13.	"Axe"	Pierce	2:09
14.	"Slice"	Matthews; Pierce; Lawry	3:36
15.	"Hedge Song"	Matthews	3:23
16.	"Totaling Dad's Car"	Matthews	1:48
17.	"Agitopop"	Matthews	0:43
18.	"Ghost of Some Cold Street"	Matthews; Pierce; Lawry	7:27
Total length:			69:12

Europe bonus track
No.	Title	Writer(s)	Length
19.	"King in Me"	Pierce

Sources: Spotify and CD liner.

== Personnel ==
- Rex Vizible – production, cello (track 6), clarinet (tracks 5, 11), backing vocals
- Roland Morris – production, engineering
- Jac Dwyer – cover art
- Chris Matthews – vocals, guitars, emulator, percussion, drum programmes, cello, minimoog, piano
- Michael Lawry – guitars, emulator, minimoog, sequencing, drum programmes, tapes, backing vocals
- Rupert E. Taylor – vocals, acoustic guitar (track 5)
- Grant Fell – bass guitar, backing vocals
- Pip Anderton – cello (track 5), violin (track 5)
- Peter Hanneveldt – piano accordion (track 3)
- Peter Moerenhout – percussion (track 5)
- Roland Morris – drum programmes, sequencing
- Mark Tierney – engineering, production
- Johnny Pierce – bass, vocals (track 13)

Source: CD liner.

== Charts ==
Chart (1988)	Peak position
New Zealand Albums (RMNZ)	18
