= Taller Than God =

Single by Strawpeople

from the album Vicarious
- B-side: "Receiving"
- Released: 1996
- Studio: The Lab (Auckland)
- Genre: Pop; house
- Length: 4:34
- Label: Columbia
- Songwriter(s): Paul Casserly; Fiona McDonald
- Producer(s): Paul Casserly; Fiona McDonald

Strawpeople singles chronology
"Under the Milky Way" (1995)	"Taller Than God" (1996)	"Boxers" (1996)

"Taller Than God" is a song released by New Zealand electronic band Strawpeople in 1996 as the lead single from their fourth album Vicarious. Written and produced by core Strawpeople member Paul Casserly and singer-songwriter Fiona McDonald, the track reached the top 20 of the New Zealand singles chart and was a finalist for Single of the Year at the New Zealand Music Awards.

== Background and development ==
Despite the commercial success of Strawpeople's third album Broadcast (1994), founding member Mark Tierney departed the band in February 1996 due to creative differences with Casserly, making Casserly the project's sole member. Though the resultant follow-up album was initially planned as a collaboration between him and previous Strawpeople guest vocalist Victoria Kelly, she also ended up leaving the project to study soundtrack composition in the United States. McDonald, another past Strawpeople vocalist who was favoured by the band's label, ultimately became Kelly's replacement.

"Taller Than God" was recorded with Stellar* member Chris van de Geer at The Lab Studios in Auckland and mixed at the city's Air Force Studios with Chris Sinclair. The track also contains input from Kelly in spite of her departure from Strawpeople, the composer being responsible for its string arrangements. It is a pop song set to a house beat with romantic lyrical themes.

A music video directed by Justin Pemberton was released for the song. Filmed at a motel in Parakai, it stars McDonald as the accommodation's receptionist and Casserly as a suspicious guest.

== Track listings ==
- New Zealand 12-inch single
1. "Taller Than God"
2. "Receiving"
- New Zealand CD and cassette single
1. "Taller Than God"
2. "Taller Than God" (Angus McNaughton remix)
3. "Receiving"
- German 12-inch promo single
1. "Taller Than God" (vocal - club mix)
2. "Taller Than God" (instrumental)
3. "Taller Than God" (radio edit)
4. "Taller Than God" (wriggle & jiggle it - mix)
5. "Taller Than God" (Angus McNaughton remix)

== Charts ==
Chart (1996)	Peak position
New Zealand (Recorded Music NZ)	19
