= ChickensHits =

Compilation album by Headless Chickens
- Released: 2002
- Label: Flying Nun Records

Headless Chickens chronology
Greedy (1997)	ChickensHits (2002)

ChickensHits is a 2002 best-of compilation album by the New Zealand band, Headless Chickens.

== Track listing ==
=== Disc 1 ===
1. "Cruise Control"
2. "George"
3. "Gaskrankinstation"
4. "Choppers" (Helibator Mix)
5. "Expecting to Fly"
6. "Donde esta la pollo"
7. "Juice"
8. "Mr Moon"
9. "Slice"
10. "Monkey Jar"
11. "Do the Headless Chicken" (original)
12. "Magnet" (single version)
13. "Dark Angel"
14. "Second Time Virgin"
15. "Smoking Big Ted"
16. "Donka" (original)
17. "Fish Song"

=== Disc 2 ===
1. "Expecting To Fly (Magik's Back To The 80's Mix)" - remixed by Dick Johnson
2. "Gaskrankinstation (Der Keine Kopf Remixen)" - remixed by Greg Churchill & Peter van der Fluit
3. "George (Magik's Electric Mix)" - remixed by Dick Johnson
4. "Cruise Control (Will & Jean Disco Mix)" - remixed by Roger Perry & Joost Langevild
5. "Juice (P&G Tips Mix)"
6. "Chicken Little (Player One Remix)" - remixed by Paul & Justin Brother
7. "Inside Track (1993 'Sushi Mix)" - remixed by David Harrow
8. "Cruise Control (1994)" - remixed by Eskimos and Egypt
9. "Juice (1994)" - remixed by Olly J
10. "Cruise Control (1994 Dub Remix)" - remixed by Eskimos and Egypt
