= James Foreman =

James Foreman may refer to:

- James Foreman (Canadian businessman) (1763–1854), important force in the business community of Nova Scotia
- James David Morton Foreman (1902–1992), New Zealand engineer and businessman
- James L. Foreman (1927–2012), American judge

== See also ==
- James Forman (disambiguation)
