= George (song) =

1994 single by Headless Chickens

Single by Headless Chickens

from the album Greedy
- A-side: "Cruise Control" (Eskimos in Egypt mix)
- B-side: "Bestiary"; "Milton Babbit's Rarotongan Holiday"
- Released: 1994
- Recorded: September 1994
- Studio: York St. (Parnell, Auckland, New Zealand)
- Genre: Alternative rock
- Length: 4:12
- Label: Flying Nun
- Songwriter: Headless Chickens
- Producers: Malcolm Welsford, Headless Chickens

Headless Chickens singles chronology
"Mr. Moon" (1993)	"George" / "Cruise Control" (1994)	"Magnet" (1997)

Music video
- "George" on YouTube

"George" is a song by New Zealand rock band Headless Chickens, released as the lead single from their third studio album, Greedy, in 1994. Charting as a double A-side with the Eskimos in Egypt mix of their 1991 song "Cruise Control", the single reached number one in the band's native New Zealand for four weeks in 1994 and 1995 and received a gold certification from the Recording Industry Association of New Zealand (RIANZ). "George" was nominated for Single of the Year at the 1995 New Zealand Music Awards, losing to Purest Form's "Message to My Girl". In 1997, the song was released in Australia, where it peaked at number 67 on the ARIA Singles Chart.

== Music video ==
The music video for "George" was directed by Stephen McGlashan and Marcus Ringrose. It features the band performing the song in black-and-white while various coloured, ominous clips are shown, including one of a tattooed man crawling across the concrete. NZ On Screen called the video "strong", noting how the tone matches the song's "menacing" lyrics. The song's video, along with the clip for the Eskimos in Egypt mix of "Cruise Control", was nominated for Best Video at 1995 New Zealand Music Awards but lost to the video for Supergroove's "Can't Get Enough".

== Track listing ==
CD and cassette single

1. "George"
2. "Cruise Control" (Eskimos in Egypt mix)
3. "Bestiary"
4. "Milton Babbit's Rarotongan Holiday"

== Credits and personnel ==
Credits are taken from the CD single and the Greedy liner notes.

Studios

- Recorded in September 1994 at York St. Studios (Parnell, Auckland, New Zealand)
- Mastered at York Street Mastering (Auckland, New Zealand)

Headless Chickens

- Headless Chickens – writing, production
  - Fiona McDonald – vocals, cover photo
  - Chris Matthews – guitars, samples, loops, keyboards
  - Grant Fell – bass guitar
  - Bevan Sweeney – drums

Other personnel

- Malcolm Welsford – production, engineering
- Nick Treacy – assistant engineering
- Gavin Botica – mastering
- Ward Four – artwork design

== Charts ==
Chart (1994–1997)	Peak position
Australia (ARIA)	67
New Zealand (Recorded Music NZ)	1

== Certifications ==
Region	Certification	Certified units/sales
New Zealand (RMNZ)	Gold	5,000^{*}
^{*} Sales figures based on certification alone.
