= Vicarious (album) =

Studio album by Strawpeople
- Released: 1996
- Studio: The Lab, Auckland, New Zealand
- Genre: Electronic
- Length: 51:06
- Label: Columbia
- Producer: Paul Casserly; Fiona McDonald

Strawpeople chronology
| Broadcast (1994) | Vicarious (1996) | 100 Street Transistors (1997) |

Singles from Vicarious
- 1. "Taller Than God" Released: 1996; 2. "Boxers" Released: 1996; 3. "Spoiler" Released: 1997

Vicarious is the fourth studio album by New Zealand band Strawpeople, featuring vocalist Fiona McDonald. Released in 1996 by Columbia Records, the electronic album produced by McDonald and Strawpeople member Paul Casserly was commercially successful, staying on the New Zealand charts for nearly six months and peaking at #4. It was also awarded Album of the Year at the 1997 New Zealand Music Awards.

== Development ==
The album was originally intended to feature Victoria Kelly as the vocalist and her and Casserly began writing songs together. However, she left New Zealand to study at a music school in the United States early in the album's development. This resulted in McDonald, a singer previously featured on Strawpeople tracks who was searching for a new musical project, being selected as the new vocalist. Casserly and McDonald wrote the songs for the album in McDonald's spare room at her Grey Lynn home as well as in Casserly's lounge. Kelly, Jeremy Morrow, Greg Johnson, and Mark Tierney (former member of Strawpeople who left the band in February 1996) are also credited as songwriters throughout the album. The album was then recorded at The Lab Studios in Auckland and mixed at Studios 301 in Sydney.

== Composition ==
Vicarious is distinct compared to other releases by Strawpeople, which contain numerous different vocalists and a number of covers. Comparatively, the album is absent of covers and McDonald is the sole vocalist. Casserly has stated that the album lacked cover songs as the band "realised that [their] own songs were doing better than the covers," referring to the success of their original songs from previous albums such as "Sweet Disorder" and "Trick With A Knife," the latter song reaching the top 40 in Australia. However, by the band's next studio album, 2000's No New Messages, they had returned to a mixture of covers and original material.

== Singles ==
Three singles were released from Vicarious. The first, "Taller Than God," spent 9 weeks on the New Zealand charts and reached #19. The next two singles, "Boxers" and "Spoiler," reached the charts but were less successful, peaking at #44 and #47 respectively. Two of the singles earned nominations at the New Zealand Music Awards: "Taller Than God" was nominated for Single of the Year and "Boxers" was nominated for Best Songwriter.

== Track listing ==
| No. | Title | Writer(s) | Length |
|---|---|---|---|
| 1. | "Taller Than God" | Paul Casserly; Fiona McDonald | 4:32 |
| 2. | "Porcelain Hands" | Casserly; Victoria Kelly; McDonald; Mark Tierney | 4:30 |
| 3. | "Gypsies" | Casserly; Kelly; McDonald; Tierney | 3:27 |
| 4. | "Spoiler" | Casserly; McDonald | 4:40 |
| 5. | "Somebody Else" | Casserly; McDonald | 4:34 |
| 6. | "Receiving" | Casserly | 5:53 |
| 7. | "Boxers" | Casserly; Greg Johnson; McDonald | 3:42 |
| 8. | "Static Symphony" | Casserly; McDonald | 5:34 |
| 9. | "Twisted" | McDonald; Jeremy Morrow | 4:05 |
| 10. | "Neon" | Casserly; McDonald | 5:45 |
| 11. | "Inject Me" | Casserly; McDonald | 3:39 |
| 12. | "Vicarious" | McDonald | 0:40 |
| Total length: | | | 51:06 |

Sources: Spotify and CD liner.

== Personnel ==
- Paul Casserly – production, programming, instrumentation
- Fiona McDonald – vocals, production, programming, instrumentation
- Jeremy Allom – mixing
- Trent Williamson – mixing assistance
- Steve Smart – mastering
- Victoria Kelly – instrumentation (tracks 2–3), string arrangements (tracks 1, 4, 7, 10)
- Mark Tierney – instrumentation (tracks 2–3)
- Jeremy Morrow – programming, production (track 9)
- Greg Johnson – trumpet (tracks 3, 5)
- Andrew McLaren – percussion (tracks 1, 4, 11)
- Chris Van de Geer – guitar (track 11)
- Chris Matthews – guitar (tracks 4, 11)
- Steve Harrop – double bass (track 5)
- Jane Cooper – cello
- Nigel Keay – viola
- Miranda Adams – violin
- Matt Fields – double bass
- Jocelyn Healy – violin
- Katherine Hebley – cello

Source: CD liner.

== Charts ==
=== Weekly charts ===
| Chart (1996) | Peak position |
|---|---|
| New Zealand Albums (RMNZ) | 4 |

=== Year-end charts ===
| Chart (1996) | Position |
|---|---|
| New Zealand Albums (RMNZ) | 44 |
