= Ruth Page =

Ruth Page is the name of:

- Ruth Page (ballerina) (1899–1991), American ballerina and choreographer
- Ruth Page (activist) (1905–1992), political activist
- Ruth Page (theologian) (1935–2015), theologian and first female principal of New College, Edinburgh
