= Abbasalutely =

Compilation album by Various artists
- Released: 1995
- Genre: Alternative rock
- Length: 54:35
- Label: Flying Nun Records

Abbasalutely is a compilation album released in 1995 by New Zealand recording label Flying Nun Records as a tribute album to ABBA.

== Track listing ==
#	Title	Length	Artist	Producer(s)
1	"Ring Ring"	3:26	Breast Secreting Cake	Nick Morgan, Sam Gibson
2	"Mamma Mia"	3:50	The 3Ds	Tex Houston
3	"Dancing Queen"	4:44	Garageland	Chris Sinclair
4	"Waterloo"	2:50	David Kilgour & Robert Scott as Cloth	Tex Houston
5	"My Love, My Life"	3:43	Bike	David Coventry
6	"Honey, Honey"	4:16	Loves Ugly Children	Tex Houston
7	"Super Trouper"	4:17	Headless Chickens	Angus McNaughton
8	"Money, Money, Money"	4:32	Chug	Tex Houston
9	"Knowing Me, Knowing You"	3:58	Superette	
10	"When I Kissed the Teacher"	3:11	The Magick Heads	Stephen Kilroy
11	"Tropical Loveland"	2:34	Martin Phillipps as Martin and the Moondogs	
12	"SOS"	3:26	Able Tasmans	Tex Houston
13	"The Name of the Game"	4:27	Shayne Carter and Fiona McDonald as Shaynie & Fifi '95	Nick Abbott
14	"On and On and On"	5:12	Tall Dwarfs	Chris Knox

== Versions ==
- Abbasalutely (Cass, Comp) Flying Nun Records, Festival Records, New Zealand 1995
- Abbasalutely (CD, Comp) Sony Records Japan 1995
- Abbasalutely (CD, Comp) Festival Records, New Zealand 1995

== See also ==
- List of ABBA tribute albums
