= List of ABBA tribute albums =

The pop group ABBA (1972–1982) exerted a strong influence on other pop musicians with many of their songs covered by other artist and at least 25 tribute albums ranging from symphony orchestras to heavy metal groups.

Artist	Cover Album	Country	Year	Comments
A-Teens	The ABBA Generation	Sweden	1999	Launched their careers singing ABBA songs. Also 2 girls, 2 boys line up
Abbacadabra	Revival – Flight 1	UK	1998	Club remixes
Abbaesque	ABBATASTIC: A Non-Stop Megamix of ABBA's Songs	UK	1998	Megamix album. Reached number 1 in the UK budget chart
Abbaesque	Die Grosse ABBA Party	UK	1999	
Amberian Dawn	Take a Chance – A Metal Tribute to ABBA	Finland	2022	
Abbaesque	Mamma Mia	UK	2002	
André Rieu	André Rieu Celebrates Abba	EU	2013	Bertus
Anne Sofie von Otter	I Let the Music Speak	Sweden	2006	Pop crossover album by opera star, featuring a selection of ABBA songs and other Andersson–Ulvaeus compositions
Brian David Gilbert	AAAH!BBA	US	2021	Halloween-themed ABBA cover EP
Cher	Dancing Queen	US	2018	Produced by Benny Andersson, Björn Ulvaeus, Cher and Mark Taylor
Erasure	Abba-esque	UK	1992	EP
E-Rotic	Thank You for the Music	Germany	1997	
Hazell Dean	The Winner Takes It All	UK	1996	Re-released as Knowing Her, Hazell Sings ABBA
James Last	James Last Plays Abba	Germany	2001	Piano
Klaus Wunderlich	Klaus Wunderlich Plays ABBA	Germany	1994	Also Klaus Wunderlich: Musical (2-CD) in 2006
London Symphony Orchestra	ABBA Played by the London Symphony Orchestra	UK	1991	With the London Pop Choir
Munich Philharmonic Orchestra	Munich Philharmonic Orchestra Plays ABBA Classic	EU	1991	
Nils Landgren Funk Unit	Funky Abba	EU	2004	ACT Music
Richard Clayderman	Richard Clayderman Plays ABBA	France	1993	Piano
Royal Philharmonic Orchestra	A Tribute to ABBA	EU	2003	Part of 3-CD set
Royal Philharmonic Orchestra	Orchestral ABBA	EU	1995	
Salma & Sabina	ABBA in Hindi	India	1981	All song titles in Hindi ('Mitha Maze Dar' is 'Dancing Queen')
San Francisco Gay Men's Chorus	ExtrABBAganza!	US	1997	
Various	ABBAmania	UK	1999	ABBA tribute show from the UK
Various	Abbasalutely	New Zealand	1995	Covers by musicians signed to Flying Nun Records
Various	ABBA Metal (A Tribute to ABBA)	Germany, Japan, Russia	2001	
Wing	Dancing Queen	New Zealand	2006	One track appeared on South Park
