= Greedy (album) =

Studio album by Headless Chickens
- Released: 1997
- Recorded: August 1995, August 1996
- Studio: Ground Zero, Airforce Studios
- Genre: Rock
- Length: 56:44
- Label: Flying Nun Records
- Producer: Malcolm Wellsford

Headless Chickens chronology
Body Blow (1991)	Greedy (1997)	ChickensHits (2002)

Greedy is the third and final studio album released by New Zealand band Headless Chickens, released in 1997 on Flying Nun Records.

== Track listing ==
1. "Dark Angel" (Chris Matthews, Grant Fell, Bevan Sweeney, Angus McNaughton) – 4:03
2. "Stalk of a Cherry" (Matthews, Fell) – 3:17
3. "Secondtime Virgin" (Matthews, Bevan Larsen, Sweeney) – 4:54
4. "Cipher" (Matthews, Larsen) – 3:05
5. "Magnet" (Matthews, Larsen) – 4:32
6. "Fire" (Matthews, Michael Lawry) – 4:35
7. "Electricity" (Matthews, Larsen) – 4:35
8. "Chicken Little" (Matthews, Larsen) – 5:51
9. "Smoking Big Ted" (Matthews, Fell, Lawry) – 2:39
10. "Black Water Rising" (Matthews, Fell, McNaughton) – 4:30
11. "Escalator" (Matthews, Fell, Sweeney, McNaughton, Fiona McDonald) – 4:53
12. "Day of the Locust" – 5:39
13. "George" – 4:11

== Personnel ==
- Chris Matthews – vocals, guitars, samples, loops, keyboards
- Bevan Larsen – bass guitar
- Bevan Sweeney – drums
- Grant Fell – bass ("Chicken Little", "Smoking Big Ted", "George")
- Angus McNaughton – samples, loops ("Dark Angel", "Chicken Little", "Smoking Big Ted", "Black Water Rising", "Day of the Locust")
- Fiona McDonald – vocals ("George"), backing vocals ("Electricity", "Escalator")
- Flex (a.k.a. Simon Claridge) – additional samples ("Secondtime Virgin", "Chicken Little")
- Rachel Wallis – backing vocals ("Stalk of a Cherry", "Magnet")

== Charts ==
Chart performance for Greedy
Chart (1997)	Peak position
Australian Albums (ARIA)	167
