= Pop Eyed =

Album by Flying Nun Records

Compilation album by Various artists
- Released: 1996
- Genre: Pop
- Label: Flying Nun Records

Pop Eyed is a New Zealand compilation album released in 1996 by Flying Nun Records containing only artists signed to the label at the time.

== Track listing ==
1. "Dust" - 3Ds
2. "Touch Me" - Superette
3. "Splat" - Bailter Space
4. "George" - Headless Chickens
5. "Save My Life" - Bike
6. "Too Much Violence" - The Clean
7. "Fingerpops" - Garageland
8. "Suck" - Loves Ugly Children
9. '76 Comeback - King Loser
10. "Half Man/Half Mole" - Chris Knox
11. "Afternoon in Bed" - The Bats
12. "Come Home" - Martin Phillips and the Chills
13. "Beached" - David Kilgour
14. "Pet Hates" - Alec Bathgate
15. "Rocky Mountain" - Bressa Creeting Cake
16. "Strangleknot" - Chug
17. "Crystalator" - Dimmer
18. "Country Sow" - Solid Gold Hell
19. "Activation" - High Dependency Unit
