= Body Blow =

- 1991 album cover

Studio album by Headless Chickens
- Released: 1991, rereleased 1993
- Genre: Rock, industrial
- Label: Flying Nun Records
- Producer: Rex Visible, Michael Koppelman

Headless Chickens chronology
| Stunt Clown (1988) | Body Blow (1991) | Greedy (1997) |

Alternative cover
- 1993 Australian version

Singles from Body Blow
- 1. "Gaskrankinstation" / "Crash Hot" Released: 1990; 2. "Cruise Control" Released: 1991; 3. "Donde esta la pollo" Released: 1992; 4. "Juice" / "Choppers" Released: 1992; 5. "Mr. Moon" Released: 1993

Body Blow is the second studio album by New Zealand rock band the Headless Chickens. It was originally released in 1991, then rereleased for Australia in 1993 with a substantially reworked track list, losing "Crash Hot" and "Road Train" but gaining "Mr. Moon", "Juice", "Choppers" and some remixes. Another Australian version followed in 1994 with the addition of a bonus disc containing six remixes.

Body Blow is Headless Chickens' most successful album, including three top-10 singles and achieving double platinum sales. The album includes a cover of "Inside Track", originally recorded as "The Inside Track" by New Zealand new wave band Stridulators.

Reviewed in Rolling Stone Australia, the first single, "Gaskrankinstation", was noted for its inability to be categorised. It was described as a "tragic saga of a callous fool trapped in a dumb job and a loveless marriage. The tempo builds inexorably with the sense of an impending catastrophe."

On 29 March 2019, an extended version was reissued.

== Track listing ==
1991 version
| No. | Title | Writer(s) | Producer | Length |
|---|---|---|---|---|
| 1. | "Donde Esta La Pollo" | A Nevison/C Matthews/Headless Chickens | Rex Visible | 3:46 |
| 2. | "Cruise Control" | C Matthews/M Lawry | Rex Visible | 4:34 |
| 3. | "Crash Hot" | | Rex Visible | 2:39 |
| 4. | "Railway Surfing" | C Matthews | Rex Visible | 4:31 |
| 5. | "Nose" | C Matthews | Rex Visible | 4:22 |
| 6. | "Million Dollar Dream" | C Matthews/M Lawry/G Fell | Rex Visible | 5:17 |
| 7. | "Gaskrankinstation" | C Matthews | Rex Visible | 4:32 |
| 8. | "Body Blow" | Headless Chickens | Rex Visible | 4:40 |
| 9. | "Road Train" | | Rex Visible | 4:40 |

1993 version
| No. | Title | Writer(s) | Producer | Length |
|---|---|---|---|---|
| 1. | "Choppers (Koppelman Mix)" | M Lawry/Headless Chickens | Michael Koppelman | 3:34 |
| 2. | "Donde esta la pollo (Kentucky Freud Mix)" | A Nevison/C Matthews/Headless Chickens | Rex Visible | 3:44 |
| 3. | "Mr. Moon" | C Matthews | Michael Koppelman | 4:30 |
| 4. | "Gaskrankinstation" | C Matthews | Rex Visible | 4:33 |
| 5. | "Body Blow" | Headless Chickens | Rex Visible | 4:40 |
| 6. | "Juice" | F McDonald/M Tierney/P Casserly | Michael Koppelman | 4:38 |
| 7. | "Cruise Control" | C Matthews/M Lawry | Rex Visible | 4:33 |
| 8. | "Million $ Dream" | C Matthews/M Lawry/G Fell | Rex Visible | 5:17 |
| 9. | "Inside Track" | C Burt/S Roach | Michael Koppelman | 5:09 |
| 10. | "Railway Surfing ('93 Octane Mix)" | C Matthews | Rex Visible | 4:30 |
| 11. | "Nose" | C Matthews | Rex Visible | 4:24 |
| 12. | "Donde Esta La Pollo (Cock Rock Mix)" | A Nevison/C Matthews/Headless Chickens | Rex Visible | 4:33 |
| 13. | "Choppers (Helibator Mix)" | M Lawry/Headless Chickens | | 4:11 |

== Personnel ==
Headless Chickens

- Chris Matthews – vocals, guitar, keyboards
- Fiona McDonald – vocals, keyboards
- Grant Fell – bass, keyboards
- Michael Lawry – keyboards
- Anthony Nevison – vocals, guitar, bass, keyboards
- Bevan Sweeney – drums

Additional personnel

- Rex Visible – keyboards

Production

- Rex Visible – engineer, producer
- Michael Koppelman – engineer, producer
- Anthony Nevison – engineer
- Phil "Feel" Jones – engineer assistant

== Chart positions ==
=== Album charts ===
| Chart | Peak position |
|---|---|
| New Zealand Albums Chart | 17 |
| Australian Albums Chart | 45 |

=== Certifications ===
| Country | Certification |
|---|---|
| New Zealand | Platinum x2 |
