= Scorpiorighting =

Studio album by Garageland
- Released: 2001
- Length: 41:39
- Label: Flying Nun Records

Garageland chronology
Do What You Want (1999)	Scorpiorighting (2001)

Professional ratings
Review scores
Source	Rating
AllMusic	4/5 stars

Scorpiorighting is the third and final studio album by New Zealand band Garageland, released in 2001.

== Track listing ==
1. "Life Is So Sweet"
2. "Get Some"
3. "Been Around"
4. "Crazy"
5. "Superstars"
6. "Carry Me South"
7. "High Way"
8. "Gone"
9. "Rock And Roll Heart"
10. "Believe In You"
11. "Who the Hell Do You Think You Are?"
12. "Shine"

== Charts ==
Chart (2001)	Peak position
New Zealand Albums (RMNZ)	13
