= Do What You Want (album) =

Studio album by Garageland
- Released: 1999
- Recorded: Lab Studios
- Genre: Indie rock, alternative rock
- Length: 49:17
- Label: Flying Nun
- Producer: Jeremy Eade, Andrew Gladstone, Chris Sinclair

Garageland chronology
Last Exit to Garageland (1997)	Do What You Want (1999)	Scorpiorighting (2001)

Professional ratings
Review scores
Source	Rating
Allmusic	4.5/5 stars

Do What You Want is an album released in 1999 by New Zealand band Garageland by recording label Flying Nun Records.

== Track listing ==
1. "Love Song"
2. "Trashcans"
3. "You Will Never Cry Again"
4. "Not Empty"
5. "Kiss It All Goodbye"
6. "Good Luck"
7. "What You Gonna Do?"
8. "Get Even"
9. "Good Morning"
10. "Burning Bridges"
11. "Jean"
12. "Middle of the Evening"
13. "End of the Night"

== Charts ==
Chart (1999)	Peak position
New Zealand Albums (RMNZ)	8
