= James Forman (disambiguation) =

James Forman (1928–2005) was an African-American leader in the civil rights movement.

James Forman may also refer to:

- James Forman Jr. (born 1967), American legal scholar
- James Henry Forman (1896–1972), World War I Canadian flying ace
- James Mtume (James Forman, born 1947), American musician

== See also ==
- James Foreman (disambiguation)
