= Garageland =

- Origin: Auckland, New Zealand
- Genres: Indie rock, pop
- Years active: 1992–2002; 2007–present
- Labels: Flying Nun Records, Foodchain Records, Discordant Records, CRS Records
- Members: Jeremy R. Eade; Dave Goodison; Mark Silvey; Andrew Gladstone
- Past members: Debbie Silvey; Andrew Claridge

Garageland are a New Zealand indie rock band on the Flying Nun record label formed in Auckland in 1992. Influenced by Pixies, Pavement, The Clean and The Velvet Underground, they were critically acclaimed in the UK and United States for their well-crafted and catchy pop songs. The band took its name from "Garageland", a song by The Clash. Their non-album single "Feel Alright" from 1998 included former The Velvet Underground member John Cale on piano.

They re-formed for a one-off gig in Auckland in November 2007 and to play The Others Way festival in September 2015

== Band members ==
=== Current ===
- Jeremy Eade – vocal, guitar
- Dave Goodison – guitar
- Mark Silvey – bass guitar
- Andrew Gladstone – backing vocalist, drums

=== Past ===
- Debbie Silvey – guitar, on early recordings including "Last Exit to Garageland"
- Andrew Claridge – guitar

== Discography ==
=== Albums ===
Year	Title	Details	Peak chart positions
Year	Title	Details	NZ
1996	Last Exit to Garageland	Label: Flying Nun Records; Catalogue: FNCD350	3
1999	Do What You Want	Label: Flying Nun Records; Catalogue:FNCD423	8
2002	Scorpiorighting	Label: CRS Records; Catalogue: FNCD452	13

=== Featured appearances ===
The group have appeared on several compilations over the years in New Zealand and overseas. The following is a list of these albums that have featured tracks by Garageland.

Year	Title	Details
1995	Abbasalutely	Song: "Dancing Queen" (ABBA cover); Label: Flying Nun Records
1996	Popeyed	Song: "Fingerpops"; Label: Flying Nun Records
2001	100% Kiwi Rock	Song: "Fingerpops"; Label: Warner Music
2001	Live at Helen's	Song: "Beelines To Heaven"; Label: Festival Mushroom Records
2002	Under the Influence	Song: "Heavenly Pop Hit" (The Chills cover) Graduation of Frustration; Label: Flying Nun Records
2003	The Strip Soundtrack	Song: "Life Is So Sweet (theme song of The Strip)"; Label: Loop Recordings Aot(ear)oa
2006	Flying Nun 25th Anniversary Box Set	Song: "What Will You Do?"; Label: Flying Nun Records

=== Singles ===
Year	Title	Peak chart positions	Album
Year	Title	NZ	Album
1995	"Come Back"	21	Come Back Special
1996	"Beelines To Heaven"	27	Come Back Special
1996	"Fingerpops"	29	Come Back Special
1996	"I'm Looking For What I Can't Get"	37	Last Exit To Garageland
1998	"Feel Alright"	—	'Non-album single'
1999	"Not Empty"	14	The Not Empty EP
1999	"What You Gonna Do?"	—	Do What You Want
1999	"Kiss It All Goodbye"	—	Do What You Want
2000	"Good Luck"	—	Do What You Want
2000	"Love Song"	—	Do What You Want
2000	"Gone"	15	Scorpio Righting
2001	"Who The Hell Do You Think You Are?"	—	Scorpio Righting
2001	"High Way"	—	Scorpio Righting
2001	"Life Is So Sweet"	—	Scorpio Righting
2001	"Crazy"	—	Scorpio Righting
