= Last Exit to Garageland =

Studio album by Garageland
- Released: 1996
- Studios: The Lab, Auckland, New Zealand
- Genre: Indie rock
- Length: 43:07
- Label: Flying Nun
- Producers: Jeremy Eade, Andrew Gladstone and Chris Sinclair

Garageland chronology
Last Exit to Garageland (1996)	Do What You Want (1999)

Professional ratings
Review scores
Source	Rating
AllMusic	4/5 stars

Last Exit to Garageland is the debut album by New Zealand band Garageland. It was released in 1996 on Flying Nun Records. The album was reissued in the UK on Discordant Records and in the US on Foodchain Records in September 1997. In 2003, Foodchain issued a newer release which included bonus tracks.

== Track listing ==
=== 1996 Flying Nun release ===
1. "Fingerpops"
2. "Classically Diseased"
3. "Beelines to Heaven"
4. "Come Back"
5. "Nude Star"
6. "Fire Away"
7. "Tired and Bored"
8. "I'm Looking for What I Can't Get"
9. "Never Gonna Come Around Here Again"
10. "Return to You"
11. "Jesus I'm Freezing"
12. "Underground Nonsense"

=== 2003 Foodchain release ===
1. Intro
2. Fingerpops
3. Classically Diseased
4. Nude Star
5. Pop Cigar
6. Beelines to Heaven
7. Come Back
8. Fire Away
9. Tired and Bored
10. I'm Looking for What I Can't Get
11. Never Gonna Come Around Here Again
12. Return to You
13. Jesus I'm Freezing
14. Fay Ray
15. Underground Nonsense
16. So You Want to Be a Rock n' Roll Star
17. Bus Stops
18. Struck
19. Graduation from Frustration
20. One Shot
21. Shouldn't Matter But It Does
22. Cherry Cola Vodka (Hold the Ice)

=== 2017 Deluxe reissue ===
1. Fingerpops (03:18)
2. Classically Diseased (02:59)
3. Beelines to Heaven (03:02)
4. Come Back (03:20)
5. Nude Star (05:27)
6. Fire Away (02:27)
7. Tired and Bored (03:55)
8. I'm Looking for What I Can't Get (02:37)
9. Never Gonna Come Around Here Again (04:04)
10. Return to You (03:05)
11. Jesus I'm Freezing (04:57)
12. Underground Nonsense (03:07)
13. Struck (03:27)
14. What Will You Do (03:01)
15. Fay Ray (02:58)
16. Pop Cigar (04:46)
17. Bus Stops (04:11)
18. Something's Got a Hold (02:31)
19. The Florida Impetigo Experience (02:59)
20. Cherry Cola Vodka (Hold the Ice) (01:22)
21. Feel Alright (04:06)
22. One Shot (03:09)

== Personnel ==
- Jeremy Eade - guitar, vocals, lead guitar, organ
- Andrew Gladstone - drums, vocals, percussion, organ
- Mark Silvey - bass
- Debbie Silvey - guitar
- Murray Smith - keyboard on "Beelines to Heaven"
- Margaret Cooke - cello on "Beelines to Heaven"
- 'The most Rev. Jimmy Deep plays on "intro" and "outro"' (liner notes)
