= ABBAmania =

Abbamania

Compilation album by Various Artists
- Released: November 8, 1999
- Recorded: 1999
- Studios: PWL Studios; Westside Studios; The Workhouse (London); PWL Studios (Manchester)
- Genres: Pop, synthpop, disco, house
- Length: 49:28
- Label: Polydor
- Producers: Alan Winstanley; Andrew Frampton; Clive Langer; Dan Sanders; Karl Twigg; Mark Topham; The Past Present Organisation; Pete Waterman; Ray Hedges; Work in Progress

Professional ratings
Review scores
Source	Rating
AllMusic	2/5 stars

ABBAmania is a tribute album to Swedish disco-pop band ABBA, released in 1999. It followed an ITV programme of the same name and featured various British and Irish artists covering ABBA songs, except for "I Know Him So Well", which originated from the musical Chess, though it was written by ABBA songwriters Benny Andersson and Björn Ulvaeus.

== Track listing ==
1. "Money, Money, Money" – Madness
2. "Lay All Your Love on Me" – Steps
3. "I Have a Dream" – Westlife
4. "Chiquitita" – Stephen Gately
5. "Gimme! Gimme! Gimme! (A Man After Midnight)" – Denise van Outen
6. "Voulez Vous" – Culture Club
7. "Mamma Mia" – Martine McCutcheon
8. "Dancing Queen" – S Club 7
9. "I Know Him So Well" – Steps
10. "Does Your Mother Know" – B*Witched
11. "The Winner Takes It All" – The Corrs
12. "Thank ABBA for the Music" – Steps, Tina Cousins, Cleopatra, B*Witched, Billie
  (Brit Awards performance)

== See also ==
List of ABBA tribute albums
