= Frank Haydn Haigh =

New Zealand lawyer and social reformer

Frank Haydn Haigh (2 May 1898 – 17 July 1992) was a New Zealand lawyer and social reformer. He was born in Lower Hutt, Wellington, New Zealand on 2 May 1898.

He was educated at Southland Boy's High School and Victoria University College, and practiced law in Auckland.
