= Ian Hamilton (cricketer) =

New Zealand cricketer

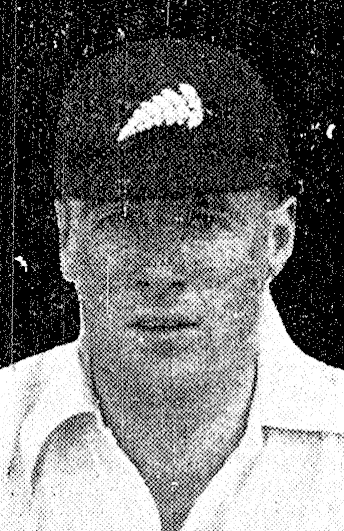

Personal information
- Full name: Ian Malone Hamilton
- Born: 13 December 1906; Christchurch, New Zealand
- Died: 29 August 1992 (aged 85); Ashburton, New Zealand
- Batting: Left-handed

Domestic team information
- Years: Team
- 1926-27 – 1932-33: Canterbury

Career statistics
Competition	First-class
Matches	17
Runs scored	788
Batting average	24.62
100s/50s	0/4
Top score	80
Balls bowled	0
Wickets	–
Bowling average	–
5 wickets in innings	–
10 wickets in match	–
Best bowling	–
Catches/stumpings	16/0
- Source: Cricket Archive, 31 January 2016

Ian Malone Hamilton (13 December 1906 – 29 August 1992) was a first-class cricketer who played twice for New Zealand in the years before New Zealand played Test cricket.

== Cricket career ==
Hamilton attended Christ's College, Christchurch, where he was a prominent cricketer. He made his first-class debut in the 1926-27 Plunket Shield, playing one match for Canterbury as a middle-order batsman. He opened the innings in 1927-28, scoring 175 runs at an average of 29.16 with a top score of 77. He also made 69 for Canterbury against the touring Australian team. He was selected to play for New Zealand in both matches against Australia at the end of the season.

In the first match against Australia in Auckland, Hamilton batted at number three and scored a bright 40, including a six off Don Blackie, in the drawn match. In the second match in Dunedin, a low-scoring affair, he batted at number six, making 12 and 4, and New Zealand lost by seven wickets.

He played on for Canterbury with moderate success until 1932-33. In the first match in 1930-31 he scored 40 and 80, his highest score, against Auckland. He also played for South Canterbury in the Hawke Cup.
