= Roderick David Finlayson =

New Zealand architectural draughtsman, writer, farm labourer and printing-room assistant

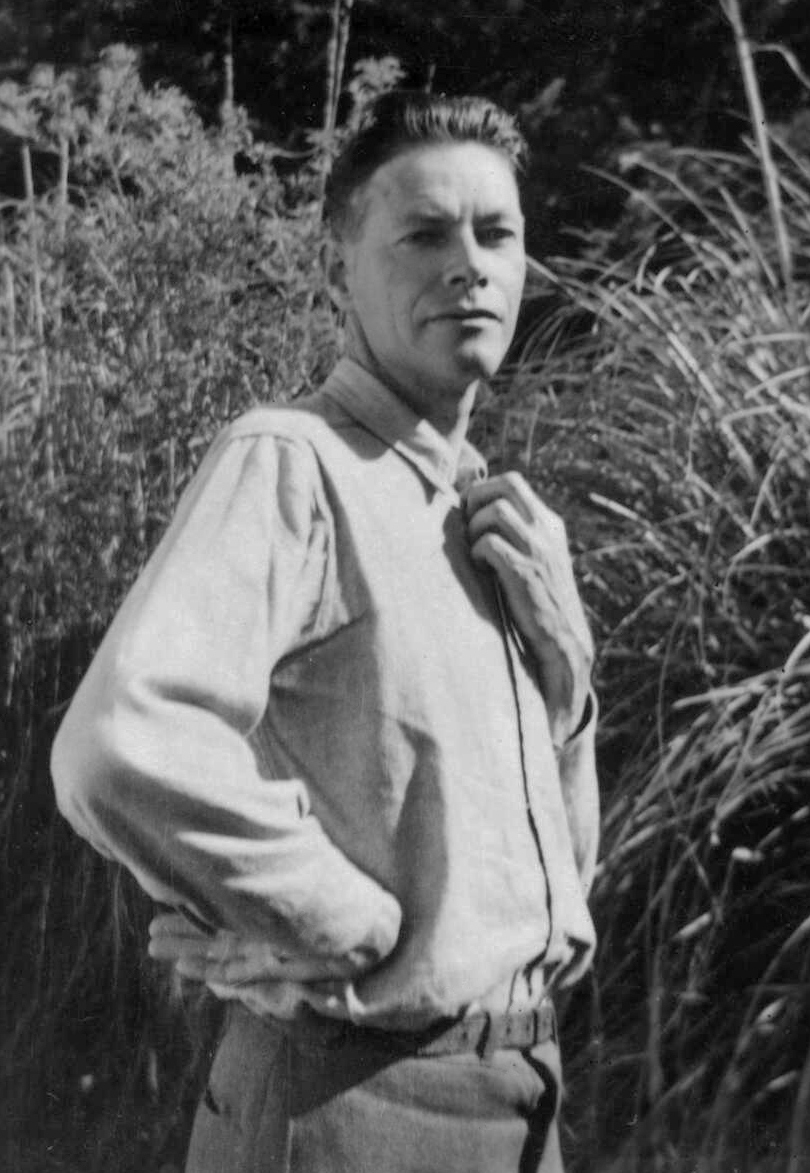
Roderick David Finlayson c. 1963

Roderick David Finlayson (26 April 1904 – 2 August 1992) was a New Zealand architectural draughtsman, writer, farm labourer and printing-room assistant. He was born in Devonport, Auckland, New Zealand on 26 April 1904.
