= Purest Form =

New Zealand vocal group

- Origin: Auckland, New Zealand
- Genres: R&B, soul, doo-wop
- Years active: 1993–1996
- Labels: Madame X
- Past members: Ben Leauanae; Keli Pepa; Mark Tautai; Tym Matagi

Purest Form were a New Zealand vocal harmony group. They are best known for their television commercial for the Rainbow's End amusement park and for their 1994 cover of Split Enz's song "Message to My Girl".

Purest Form were the first all-Polynesian pop group to achieve chart success in New Zealand and were considered positive role models for a generation of young Polynesian New Zealanders.

== History ==
Purest Form originally formed as a vocal quartet at Onehunga High School. The group were discovered busking in downtown Auckland by a manager of the Rainbow's End amusement park. Purest Form then recorded an a cappella doo-wop version of the Rainbow's End ad jingle and filmed a television commercial.

The group were managed by Ondrej Havas and Steven Mountjoy and were signed to their label Madame X. Ondrej later went on to manage boy band Spacifix.

Purest Form released five singles, with the first four charting in the New Zealand top 40. Purest Form's debut single was a cover of Split Enz's song "Message to My Girl", which peaked at number two. Split Enz band member Eddie Rayner co-produced the song. The "Message to My Girl" single included mixes of the Rainbow's End song. Purest Form also covered the Beatles' song "If I Fell" and released three original songs, including the Christmas ballad "You Don't Have To Cry".

At the 1995 New Zealand Music Awards, "Message to My Girl" won Single of the Year, with Purest Form also nominated for Most Promising Group.

The group eventually split up in 1997, with Mark Tautai joining the Polynesian vocal quartet Jamoa Jam.

In October 2013, the group reunited on the TV3 comedy panel show 7 Days, where they performed the Rainbow's End song.

== Discography ==
=== Singles ===
Year	Title	Peak chart positions	Certifications	Album
Year	Title	NZ	Certifications	Album
1994	"Message to My Girl"	2	RMNZ: Platinum	Non-album single
1994	"It's Christmas (You Don't Have To Cry)"	11		Non-album single
1995	"U Can Do It"	31		Non-album single
1995	"If I Fell"	30		Non-album single
1996	"Lady"	—		Non-album single
"—" denotes a recording that did not chart or was not released in that territory.

== Awards and nominations ==
Year	Nominee / work	Award	Result	Ref.
1995	"Message to My Girl"	New Zealand Music Awards - Single of the Year	Won	
1995	Purest Form	New Zealand Music Awards - Most Promising Group	Nominated	
1996	"If I Fell"/"U Can Do It"	New Zealand Music Awards - Best Polynesian Album	Nominated	
