= James Foreman (Canadian businessman) =

- Born: 21 December 1763; Coldstream, Scotland
- Died: 25 October 1854 (aged 90); Halifax, Nova Scotia

James Foreman (21 December 1763 – 25 October 1854) was a Scottish immigrant to Canada who became an important force in the business community of Nova Scotia.
