= John Nimmo (cricketer) =

New Zealand cricketer (1910–1994)

John Robert Nimmo (12 June 1910 – 2 November 1994) was a New Zealand cricketer. He played two first-class matches for Otago, one in each of the 1933–34 and 1936–37 seasons.

Nimmo was born at Dunedin in 1910 and worked as a clerk in the city. A fast bowler who played club cricket for Carisbrook and, for a time, Balclutha, he made his representative debut for Otago in a December 1933 match against Canterbury at Lancaster Park in Christchurch. Considered a young player with a "good reputation", he opened the bowling, taking two wickets in the Canterbury first innings and scoring five runs during the match. His other first-class match came against the same opposition in February 1937 at Carisbrook. Called back into the team after having bowled "exceedingly well" for Carisbrook, he took another three wickets in the match and made scores of four in his first innings and 42 not out in his second, part of a ninth wicket partnership of 73 runs with Jack Dunning.

Although he did not make any further first-class appearances for the team, Nimmo played for Otago against an English touring team organised by Julien Cahn in the 1938–39 season and in matches against Southland in the following two seasons.

Nimmo died at Dunedin in 1994 at the age of 84. An obituary was published in the 1995 edition of the New Zealand Cricket Almanack.
