= Joan Cochran =

New Zealand social reformer and sex educator

- Born: Joan Embury Feltham; 16 October 1912; Wellington, New Zealand
- Died: 31 July 1995 (aged 82); Wellington, New Zealand
- Education: Victoria University College

Joan Embury Cochran (née Feltham; 16 October 1912 – 31 July 1995) was a New Zealand social reformer, sex educator and teacher.

== Biography ==
She was born in Wellington, New Zealand, on 16 October 1912. She was the second child of Harriett Embury and her husband, Edgar Charles Feltham, who worked as a schoolteacher. Her elder sister died in 1914. Her brother had health problems connected with brain. She attended Kilbirnie School and then Wellington East Girls' College

She studied English language courses at Victoria University College from 1930 until 1933, where she got both BA and MA degrees. After graduating, from 1935 until 1944 she was the editor in the movement's magazine, Open Windows (later the Student). Joan was also responsible for youth camps for the Methodist church and worked for the YWCA, writing articles for the New Zealand Girl journal.

After the start of the Second World War she took part in a Campaign for Christian Order. In 1942 she wrote Sex, love and marriage and gave lectures on sexuality and the family. In 1944 the Cochrans wrote Meeting and mating about their views on sex and Christian marriage. In 1945 she wrote Understanding yourself, which was connected to a juvenile delinquency.

In 1948 she visited the first conference of the World Council of Churches in Amsterdam. When she returned to New Zealand she was a member of the Methodist Church's Board of Publications and wrote several religious tracts.

She helped to establish the Cashmere Methodist Community Centre in Khandallah, opened in June 1952. In 1954 she toured around Australia as a guest speaker for that country's Home and Family Weeks. In 1964 she became a founding member of the Indecent Publications Tribunal, where she had served for 1o years.

She taught at Queen Margaret College, Wellington, in 1956, and from 1960 to 1980. She became first assistant in 1966.

Joan Cochran died at Wellington on 31 July 1995.

== Private life ==
During her studying at university she met an English lecturer Andrew Bruce Cochran, who was 10 years older than her. They married at Trinity Methodist Church, Wellington South, on 13 August 1935, and moved to Khandallah. They had two daughters and a son.
