= Harry Jacks =

New Zealand soldier, plant pathologist, lecturer and forester

Harry Jacks (born Herman Jekeles on 5 August 1908–19 August 1994) was a New Zealand soldier, plant pathologist, lecturer and forester. He was born in the Bukowina, Austria-Hungary, Chernivtsi Oblast, Ukraine.
