= Edna Pearce =

Kindergarten teacher and director, policewoman, internment camp supervisor

Edna Bertha Pearce (26 March 1906 – 23 May 1995) was a New Zealand kindergarten teacher and director, policewoman, and internment camp supervisor. She was born in Christchurch, New Zealand, in 1906. She made New Zealand's first arrest by a policewoman, and when she was transferred to Hamilton in 1966 she was the city's only female police officer.
