= Abbaesque =

- Genres: Pop
- Website: www.abbaesque.ie

Abbaesque is an Irish tribute band to the Swedish band ABBA. With five members, they are Ireland's most successful tribute show, performing in excess of 150 sell out shows each year throughout the entire country.

Abbaesque sold out Dublin's 11,000 capacity Point Theatre on New Year's Eve 1998, and have played Saturday night residencies in the capital's prestigious Olympia Theatre. TV appearances have included The Late Late Show, Live at 3, The Gerry Ryan Show, Open House, and The Den, as well as the 98FM Breakfast show and the Pat Kenny Show on radio. Abbaesque have also performed at all of Ireland's major festivals including Galway's Black Box, and the internationally renowned Rose of Tralee festival, playing to crowds of more than 10,000 per night.

Abbaesque have worked hard to achieve an attention to detail, to convincingly re-produce the sound and look of the original ABBA. Their live act is filled with back-to-back hits such as "Waterloo", "Dancing Queen", "Money, Money, Money", "Thank You for the Music", "Knowing Me, Knowing You", "S.O.S." and many more, as well as costume changes and musical arrangements reminiscent of the original ABBA.
