= Trinity Spooner-Neera =

- Born: October 2, 1994 (age 32)
- Height: 1.89 m (6 ft 2 1/2 in)
- Weight: 90 kg (200 lb; 14 st 2 lb)

Rugby union career
- Position(s): Fullback, Fly-half
Provincial / State sides
Years	Team	Apps	(Points)
2012–14	Hawke's Bay	11	(0)
2015	Wanganui	8	(104)
2016–	Taranaki	1	(5)
- Correct as of 23 October 2016
Super Rugby
Years	Team	Apps	(Points)
2013	Hurricanes	2	(0)
National sevens team
Years	Team		Comps
2013	New Zealand 7s		4
- Correct as of 7 July 2016

Trinity Spooner-Neera is a current player for the New Zealand-based Hawkes Bay Magpies rugby union team. He plays fullback and second five eight. He has played for the Magpies in 11 games, and is currently part of the Hurricanes Development Squad. He has 2 caps for the Hurricanes, both off the bench.
