= Ross Geange =

New Zealand sport shooter (born 1969)

Personal information
- Full name: Ross Murray Geange
- Born: 29 May 1969 (age 57)

Sport
- Sport: Fullbore rifle shooting

Achievements and titles
- National finals: Ballinger Belt (1995, 1997, 2015, 2025)

Ross Murray Geange (born 25 May 1969) is a New Zealand sports shooter. He competed at the 1994 Commonwealth Games, where he was 8th in the fullbore rifle Queen's prize pair and 12th in the Queen's prize individual, and at the 1998 Commonwealth Games, finishing 9th in the fullbore rifle Queen's prize pair and 17th in the Queen's prize individual.

He has won the Ballinger Belt at the New Zealand rifle shooting championships four times—in 1995, 1997, 2015 and 2025—and on two other occasions has been the top New Zealander, finishing fourth overall in 2003 and second in 2010.
