= James McHaffie =

Scottish-born New Zealand cricketer

James McHaffie (22 June 1910 – 27 May 1994) was a Scottish-born doctor and cricketer who played a single match of first-class cricket in New Zealand for Otago during the 1931–32 season.

McHaffie was born at Glasgow in 1910 and emigrated to New Zealand with his family during his youth. He was educated at Otago Boys' High School in Dunedin. His only top-level representative match was a January 1932 Plunket Shield fixture against Auckland at Eden Park. Batting towards the bottom of the order, McHaffie scored 19 runs during the match and did not bowl.

McHaffie died at Wellington in 1994. He was aged 83.
