= Eskimos and Egypt =

Eskimos and Egypt were a late 1980s to mid-1990s crossover band based out of Manchester, England. The band's members were Paul Cundall on keyboards and synthesizer, David Cameron-Pryde on bass and keyboards, Mark Compton on guitar and keyboards and Christopher O'Hare on vocals and keyboards. Their unofficial fifth member was long term collaborator Mark Stagg, who acted as engineer. The band was started by Cameron-Pryde and O'Hare and original drummer Nigel Heywood, who now lives in the United States.

== Career ==
The band were influenced by early electronic acts such as Kraftwerk, the Human League, and Gary Numan, underground electronic acts such as SPK, Clan of Xymox, and the Passage and 4AD acts such as This Mortal Coil. They were known as one of the first acts to incorporate live instruments into early 1990s dance music, and their live shows were a mix of dance based electronica and metal guitars.

In the band's formative years they recorded an early 7" vinyl single in 1987 called "The Cold EP", which was released on Manchester indie Village Records. The single included the tracks "The Cold", "Screams and Whispers" and "A Year". The single was played on John Peel's BBC Radio 1 show and attracted DEF Management (Moby/Sparks/Robyn/Sonique), who went on to manage the band for the duration of their musical career. They signed to the One Little Indian record Label and released a series of singles that were well received in dance clubs in the UK, especially "The Power of G'N'R'" and their breakthrough singles "Fall from Grace" and "UK-USA".

The band's debut album Perfect Disease was released on One Little Indian Records in 1993. Their follow up The Rest Is Silence was released in Germany and Japan, after a label change to Motor Music (Polygram). In 1997, they released Kamikaze and toured Germany with the likes of Rammstein and Faith No More. Cundall left the band as they moved more into production (producing mixes for Moby, Sparks, Rammstein, the Tamperer, and produced and played instruments on "Cruise Control", a New Zealand number 1 single by New Zealand band The Headless Chickens. They recorded a fourth album with the working title Geek which never saw a full commercial release and signalled the end for the band.

Since the split of Eskimos and Egypt, Cameron-Pryde and Compton, together with Stagg have produced tracks and albums for various bands including Sonique, t.A.T.u. and Erasure. They also produced and co-wrote the music and lyrics for "The Spirit of the Hawk" by Rednex; a 9-week number one single in Europe. They write and produce under the name FAF and Cap Com Productions. Compton manages the Manchester band Bauer and Cameron-Pryde has managed the bands Kid British (Mercury Records) and Goldheart Assembly (Fierce Panda Records) as well as unsigned artists Orchids and Dieter & The Gadabouts. He has recently set up his own label, MUK, based in Manchester. MUK's launch party will be held at Manchester's Academy 3 on Saturday 20 October 2012.

After leaving Eskimos & Egypt, vocalist Chris O'Hare relocated to London. Working as a multimedia designer in the music industry, where he created CD covers, websites and videos for acts such as Madonna, Enya, Red Hot Chili Peppers and Toploader. He then spent 4 years working in The City, and founded COH Associates, a creative consultancy for the financial services sector in 2007. After selling that business in 2011, Chris set up COH Creative Consultants in 2013. In 2018, he then formed COH Property, and is now a successful property investor and Hotelier.

After the band split, keyboard player Paul Cundall released a couple of dance 12 inches ("Let It Go" and "Insanity") on the Low Sense Label under the name Con. The track "Let It Go" did quite well in the clubs over Europe and was released on German record label, Typhoon Records. "Let It Go" also featured on the DJ Baby Anne compilation album Dark Side of the Boom. Cundall now works as an Information Analyst/Developer for the NHS in Manchester and continues to write music under the name Con in his spare time.

== Discography ==
=== Charting singles ===
List of singles, with selected chart positions
Title	Year	Chart positions	
Title	Year	UK	AUS
"Fall from Grace"	1993	51	186
"UK-USA"	1993	53	187
