= Freda White =

New Zealand equestrian

Evelyn Freda White (10 November 1909 – 14 August 1995) was a New Zealand show-jumper and racehorse trainer. She was born in Napier, New Zealand, in 1909.
