= Hēmi Pōtatau =

Māori minister, soldier, writer (1904–1994)

Hēmi Pōtatau (20 May 1904 – 18 January 1994) was a New Zealand Presbyterian minister, soldier, writer. Of Māori descent, he identified with the Ngāti Kahungunu and Ngāti Rākaipaaka iwi. He was born in Nūhaka, Hawke's Bay, New Zealand, in 1904. He also wrote the Scots College haka in 1959.

Pōtatau's book, He Hokinga Mahara, published in 1991, was selected as one of the 180 most significant works of Māori-authored non-fiction through inclusion in Books of Mana.
