= James David Morton Foreman =

James David Morton Foreman (24 April 1902–4 June 1992) was a New Zealand engineer, car salesman, businessman, plastics manufacturer and dollmaker. He was born in Pendleton, Lancashire, England on 24 April 1902.
