= Ruth Page (activist) =

New Zealand teacher and activist (1905–1992)

Ruth Allan Page (née Ross; 23 November 1905 – 13 October 1992) was a New Zealand teacher and pro-railway political activist. She was born in Whangārei, New Zealand, in 1905.

She died in Christchurch in 1992 and was buried in Wakapuaka Cemetery in Nelson.
