= Headless Chickens =

New Zealand band

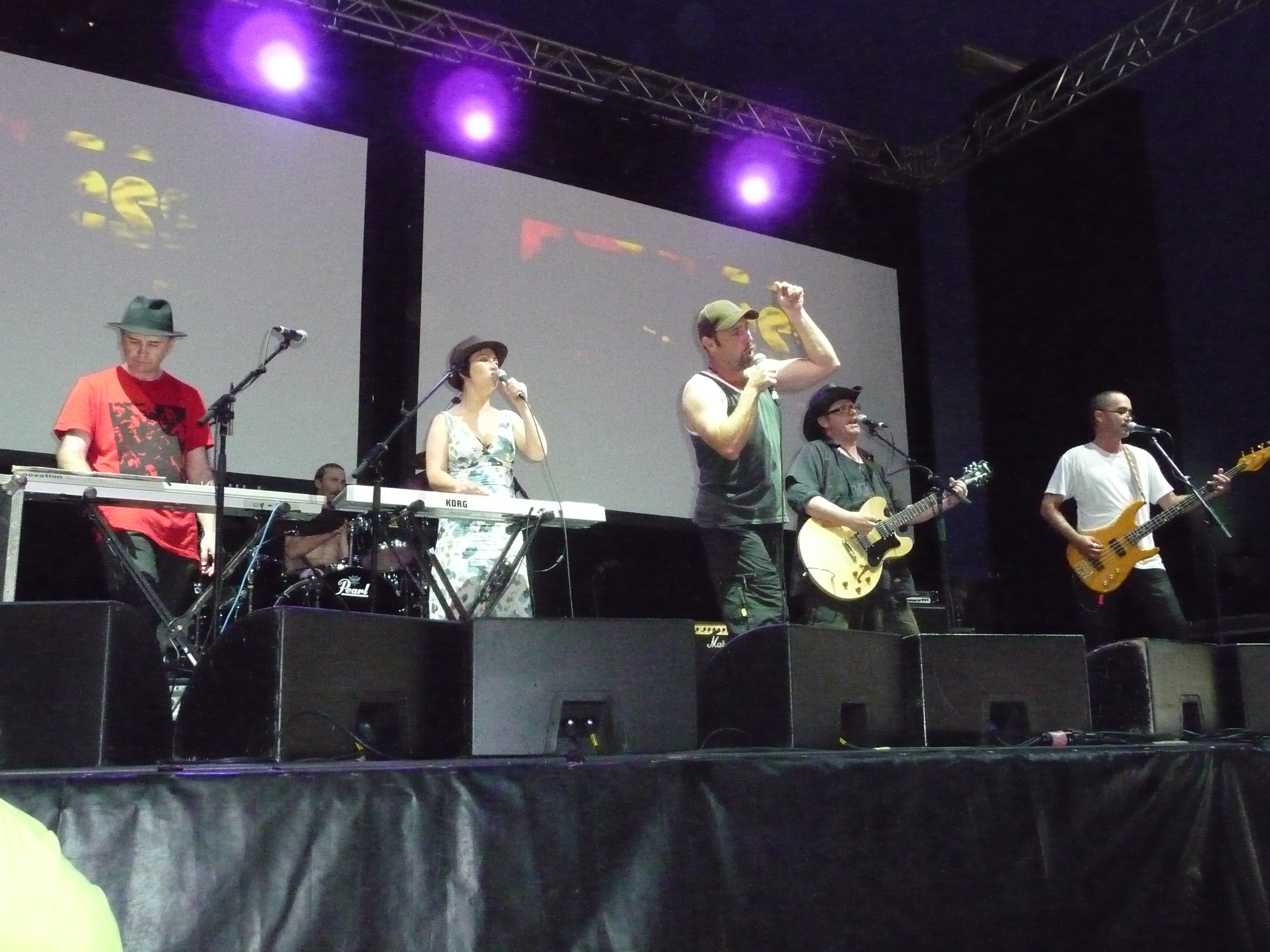
- Headless Chickens at Homebake 2008

Background information
- Origin: New Zealand
- Genres: Rock, industrial rock
- Years active: 1985–1999, 2008–2009
- Label: Flying Nun
- Past members: Chris Matthews; Fiona McDonald; Johnny Pierce; Michael Lawry; Grant Fell; Bevan Sweeney; Anthony Nevison; Rupert E. Taylor; Bevan Larsen; Flex - aka Simon Claridge; Angus McNaughton; Gerard Presland; John McDermott

The Headless Chickens was a New Zealand band. Going against the grain of the Dunedin sound that dominated the Flying Nun Records roster at the time, the Headless Chickens made extensive use of electronic instruments in their music. They recorded three studio albums, Stunt Clown (1988), Body Blow (1991), and Greedy (1997).

== History ==
The Headless Chickens recorded three albums, Stunt Clown (1988), Body Blow (1991), and Greedy (1997), plus various EPs for Flying Nun Records in the 1980s and 1990s.

The band first became known in New Zealand when they won the 1987 Rheineck Beer Rock award. The prize money from the award went into the funding for their innovative (for its use of sampling) 1988 debut album Stunt Clown.

The 1988 CD release of Stunt Clown compiled the vinyl release of this name with the 1986 Headless Chickens EP.

A second album, Body Blow, appeared in 1991 which featured singer Fiona McDonald. It was during this time that the band had their widest audience. Two versions of Body Blow were released, with the revised and expanded 1993 version going double platinum in New Zealand.

This album spawned the single "Cruise Control" which became a hit in New Zealand and (in a remixed form) Australia. "Cruise Control" was notable for its sampling, particularly for elements of Shona Laing's 1973 single "1905" and the Crocodiles' 1980 single "Tears".

At the time, the band's use of electronic elements and sampling in a "rock" setting was out of the ordinary and had an influence on many other N.Z. bands that followed them.

The follow-up 1997 Greedy album took several years to complete, and during that time several band members left, including singer McDonald. Greedy contained the track "George" which became a No. 1 hit single in their home country; "George" was the first (and so far, only) track from the Flying Nun Records label to achieve No. 1 status.

The Headless Chickens split up soon after the release of Greedy.

In 2002 Flying Nun Records released a 2CD best-of compilation named ChickensHits.

In July 2008 it was announced that the band would reform to play the Homebake Festival in Sydney, Australia on 6 December. The line-up would feature both Chris Matthews and Fiona McDonald. They played further concerts in Australia and New Zealand and were scheduled to play at the Auckland Big Day Out in January 2009.

On 27 January 2018, bassist Grant Fell died of cancer at the age of 56. Less than three months later, Stunt Clown was awarded the IMNZ Classic Record Award at the 2018 Taite Music Prize, where Chris Matthews controversially sprinkled some of Fell's ashes onstage. Anthony Nevison died in November 2025.

== Discography ==
=== Albums ===
Year	Title	Details	Peak chart positions		Certifications
Year	Title	Details	NZ	AUS	Certifications
1988	Stunt Clown	Label: Flying Nun Records; Catalogue: FN100	18	—	
1991	Body Blow	Label: Flying Nun Records/Festival Music; Catalogue: FN206 / D30939	17	46	NZ: 2×Platinum
1997	Greedy	Label: Flying Nun Records/Festival Music; Catalogue: FNCD320	—	167	
2002	ChickensHits	Label: Flying Nun Records; Catalogue: FNCD467	26	—	
"—" denotes a recording that did not chart or was not released in that territory.

=== Singles ===
Year	Title	Peak chart positions		Album
Year	Title	NZ	AUS	Album
1988	"Soulcatcher" / "Donka"	-	-	Stunt Clown
1989	"Expecting to Fly"	-	-	Stunt Clown
1990	"Gaskrankinstation" / "Crash Hot"	28	-	Body Blow
1991	"Cruise Control"	6	23	Body Blow
1992	"Donde esta la pollo"	4	161	Body Blow
1992	"Juice" / "Choppers"	7	104	Body Blow
1993	"Mr. Moon"	22	93	Body Blow
1994	"George" / "Cruise Control"	1	67	Greedy
1997	"Magnet"	-	-	Greedy
1997	"Dark Angel"	-	-	Greedy
1998	"Secondtime Virgin"	-	-	Greedy

=== Featured appearances ===
The group have appeared on many compilations and soundtracks since 1990 in New Zealand and Australia, including the following.

Year	Title	Label	Track
1990	In Love With These Times	Flying Nun Records	Donca
1991	Aotearoa: Stand Strong '91	Festival	Cruise Control
1991	Getting Older 1981-1991	Flying Nun Records	Totalling Dad's Car
1991	Pink Flying Saucers Over the Southern Alps	Flying Nun Records	Railway Surfing
1993	Collision	White	Cruise Control
1994	Abbasalutely	Flying Nun Records	Super Trouper (ABBA cover)
1996	In The Neighbourhood	Warner Music	Cruise Control
1996	Popeyed	Flying Nun Records	George
1999	Scarfies	Flying Nun Records	George
2002	Absolute Bliss	Festival	Cruise Control
2003	Give It A Whirl	Propeller Records	Gaskrankinstation
2003	Nature's Best 3	Sony Music Entertainment	Cruise Control

== Awards ==
Year	Nominee / work	Award	Result
1987	Headless Chickens	Rheineck Rock Award	Won
1992	Body Blow	NZ Music Awards - Album of the Year	Won
1992	"Cruise Control"	NZ Music Awards - Single of the Year	Nominated
1992	Fiona McDonald	NZ Music Awards - Best Female Vocalist	Won
1992	Headless Chickens	NZ Music Awards - Best Group	Nominated
1992	"Cruise Control"	NZ Music Awards - Best Video	Nominated
1992	Rex Visible (Body Blow)	NZ Music Awards - Best Producer	Nominated
1994	"Juice"/"Choppers"	NZ Music Awards - Single of the Year	Won
1994	Fiona McDonald	NZ Music Awards - Best Female Vocalist	Won
1994	Headless Chickens	NZ Music Awards - Best Group	Won
1994	Headless Chickens	NZ Music Awards - International Achievement	Nominated
1994	Johnny Ogilvie ("Mr Moon")	NZ Music Awards - Best Video	Nominated
1995	Johnny Ogilvie ("Cruise Control")	NZ Music Awards - Best Video	Nominated
