= Cruise Control (Headless Chickens song) =

1991 single by Headless Chickens

Single by Headless Chickens

from the album Body Blow
- B-side: "I'm Talking to You"
- Released: 1991
- Recorded: 1991
- Studio: Incubator (Auckland, New Zealand)
- Length: 4:31
- Label: Flying Nun; Festival
- Songwriters: Chris Matthews; Michael Lawry
- Producer: Rex Visible

Headless Chickens singles chronology
"Gaskrankinstation" / "Crash Hot" (1990)	"Cruise Control" (1991)	"Donde esta la pollo" (1992)

Audio
- "Cruise Control" (original version) on YouTube

"Cruise Control (Eskimos in Egypt mix)"

Single by Headless Chickens
- A-side: "George" (New Zealand only)
- B-side: "Railway Surfing" (Octane mix); "Inside Track"
- Released: 1994
- Length: 3:53
- Label: Flying Nun; Festival; Mushroom
- Songwriters: Chris Matthews; Michael Lawry
- Producer: Rex Visible

Headless Chickens singles chronology
"Mr. Moon" (1993)	"George" / "Cruise Control" (1994)	"Magnet" (1997)

Audio
- "Cruise Control" (Eskimos in Egypt mix) on YouTube

"Cruise Control" is a song by New Zealand band Headless Chickens. Written by members Chris Matthews and Michael Lawry, the track was released as the second single from the band's second studio album, Body Blow (1991), in 1991 and reached number six on the New Zealand Singles Chart. Three years later, the song was remixed and re-released as the "Eskimos in Egypt" mix. This version of the song peaked at number 26 in Australia and topped the New Zealand chart as a double A-side with "George".

An accompanying video was made for the remix, featuring Headless Chickens riding in a car at night. Both versions of the track were produced by Rex Visible and included on the band's 2002 compilation album, ChickensHits. The song and its videos have received numerous accolades, including being named the 76th-greatest New Zealand song of all time by the Australasian Performing Right Association (APRA).

== Release, reception, and promotion ==
"Cruise Control" was first released on Headless Chickens' second album, Body Blow, in 1991. The same year, the song was issued as the album's second single in New Zealand. On 1 September 1991, the single debuted on the RIANZ Singles Chart at number 28. Over the next eight weeks, the song rose and fell within the top 30 until rising to its peak of number six on 3 November. Afterwards, the single descended from the chart, spending five weeks in the top 10 and 20 weeks in the top 50. The original version of "Cruise Control" remains the band's longest-charting single in their home country. In Australia, the original single was released on 26 August 1991 but did not enter the ARIA Singles Chart top 100. On 27 May 1992, the single was re-released in a remixed form by David Harrow but once again failed to chart.

In 1994, the track was remixed by English band Eskimos and Egypt as the "Eskimos in Egypt" mix and released as a single. In Australia, a CD was issued on 3 October 1994 while a cassette was released on 7 November. On 30 October, the remix debuted at number 92 on the ARIA Singles Chart. Seven weeks later, it peaked at number 26, staying on the chart for 11 weeks and becoming the band's only single to enter the top 50 in Australia. In New Zealand, the remix was issued as a double A-side with new song "George", peaking atop the RIANZ chart for four nonconsecutive weeks in 1994 and 1995. This release spent 17 weeks in the top 50 and is Headless Chickens' highest-charting single in New Zealand, earning a gold sales certification for selling over 5,000 copies.

Critically, New Zealand film and television website NZ on Screen called the Eskimos in Egypt mix one of the band's "most poppy and accessible songs". A music video directed by Jonathan Ogilvie was made for the remix, featuring Headless Chickens in a Citroën DS car as they ride through various landscapes at night. Throughout the video, the members partake in various activities, including eating lollipops, shaving, talking on mobile phones, and holding up a poster of the Knight Rider franchise.

== Awards and accolades ==
The original version of "Cruise Control" was nominated for Single of the Year at the 1992 New Zealand Music Awards, losing to "Why Does Love Do This to Me" by the Exponents, while the original video was nominated for Best Video, losing to the clip for Push Push's song "Trippin'". In 1995, the video for the remix was nominated for the same award (as was the video for "George") but lost again, this time to Supergroove's "Can't Get Enough" video. In 2001, the APRA named the original version of "Cruise Control" the 76th-best "New Zealand Song of All Time".

== Track listings ==
New Zealand CD, 12-inch, and cassette single

1. "Cruise Control" (album mix) – 4:31
2. "Cruise Control" (Eros mix) – 4:31
3. "Cruise Control" (SOB mix) – 6:32
4. "I'm Talking to You" – 3:03

Australian and UK CD single

1. "Cruise Control" (Eskimos in Egypt mix) – 3:53
2. "Railway Surfing" (Octane mix) – 4:31
3. "Cruise Control" (original mix) – 4:33
4. "Inside Track" – 5:09

Australian 7-inch single

A. "Cruise Control" (Eskimos in Egypt mix) – 3:53
B. "Railway Surfing" (Octane mix) – 4:31

CD and cassette single (with "George")

1. "George"
2. "Cruise Control" (Eskimos in Egypt mix)
3. "Bestiary"
4. "Milton Babbit's Rarotongan Holiday"

== Credits and personnel ==
Credits are lifted from the CD singles and the Body Blow album booklet.

Studios

- Recorded and mixed in 1991 at Incubator Studios (Auckland, New Zealand)
- Mastered at Precision Mastering (Los Angeles)

Personnel

- Chris Matthews – writing, vocals, guitars, keyboards, programs
- Michael Lawry – keyboards, programs
- Fiona McDonald – vocals, keyboards
- Anthony Nevison – vocals, guitars, bass, keyboards, programs, engineering
- Bevan Sweeney – drums, programs
- Grant Fell – bass, keyboards
- Rex Visible – keyboards, programs, production, engineering
- Angus McNaughton – programs
- Becky Nunes – photography

Remix personnel

- Eskimos and Egypt – remixing
- Staggman – engineering
- Gideon Keith – cover design
- Ade Britteon – inside cover and disc artwork
- Mushroom Art – inside cover and disc artwork
- Wayne Wilson – photography

== Charts ==
=== Original version ===
Chart (1991)	Peak position
New Zealand (Recorded Music NZ)	6

=== Eskimos in Egypt mix ===
Chart (1994–1995)	Peak position
Australia (ARIA)	26
New Zealand (Recorded Music NZ) with "George"	1

== Certifications ==
Region	Certification	Certified units/sales
New Zealand (RMNZ)	Gold	5,000^{*}
^{*} Sales figures based on certification alone.
