= Michael Lawry =

New Zealand rock musician

Michael Lawry is a New Zealand rock musician. He is a member of numerous bands, notably The Headless Chickens (founder member) for whom he played the keyboards and experimented with sampling. The 1991 single "Cruise Control", co-written by Chris Matthews and Michael Lawry was voted by APRA's members as the 76th greatest New Zealand song of all time.

Michael took part in the reformation of The Headless Chickens in late 2008 / early 2009.

Michael Lawry is a conservationist and environmental activist, and since 2012 has been the managing director of Sea Shepherd New Zealand.
