= Strawpeople =

New Zealand band

- Origin: New Zealand
- Years active: 1985–present
- Labels: Sony BMG; Bigpop
- Members: Paul Casserly; Fiona McDonald
- Past members: Mark Tierney; Stephanie Tauevihi; Fiona McDonald

Strawpeople are a New Zealand band. They were created by Paul Casserly and Mark Tierney after they had met while working at the Auckland university radio station now known as 95 bFM. Over the years, Strawpeople has brought together various New Zealand songwriters, vocalists and musicians in a collaborative effort and achieved some success.

== Early years ==
Strawpeople was created by Paul Casserly and Mark Tierney in 1985 when they were both working at 95bFM.

In 1990, Strawpeople released the single "One Good Reason", a cover of The Swingers' song from 1981, which was followed by their debut studio album Hemisphere.

In 1992, Strawpeople released Worldservice, which included a cover of "Have a Little Faith", which became their first single and album on the New Zealand charts. The album also contained "Wings of Desire", which includes sound clips of Jane Fonda from Klute; the song was prominently featured in the 1995 film To Die For.

The third album Broadcast was released in September 1994 and reached number seven on the New Zealand charts. The single "Sweet Disorder" won the 1995 APRA Silver Scroll Award as well as winning the duo the Songwriting award at the 1996 New Zealand Music Awards. "Sweet Disorder" was voted one of the APRA Top 100 New Zealand Songs of All Time, and was included on the related Nature's Best 2 CD.

In 1996 Tierney left Strawpeople. Casserly began writing with Victoria Kelly. In August 1996, the group released their fourth studio album, Vicarious, which became their most commercially successful album, peaking at number four on the New Zealand albums chart and winning Album of the Year at the 1997 New Zealand Music Awards.

In 1997, the group released the remix album, 100 Street Transistors.

In April 2000, the group released their fifth studio album No New Messages, followed by the compilation The Best Of 1990>2000 in November of the same year. Their cover of The Cars' "Drive", featured vocals from fellow New Zealand musician Bic Runga and peaked at number 7 on the singles chart.

Recorded over a 3 year period, the group released their sixth studio album Count Backwards from 10 in August 2004.

In August 2023, Strawpeople released their first album in 20 years, titled Knucklebones recorded at Bigpop studios with long time collaborators Joost Langeveld & Chris van de Geer

== Vocalists ==
The Strawpeople, being a studio based recording outfit, have had a revolving door lineup of vocalists, normally female and from New Zealand. Notable vocalists include Leza Corban, Stephanie Tauevihi, Fiona McDonald (a vocalist from New Zealand band The Headless Chickens).

== Discography ==
=== Studio albums ===
List of studio albums, with selected details and chart positions
Title	Details	Peak positions	
Title	Details	NZ	AUS
Hemisphere	Released: 1991; Label: Pagan Records; Catalogue number: PACD1067	—	—
Worldservice	Released: 1992; Label: Pagan Records; Catalogue number: PACD1086	30	—
Broadcast	Released: September 1994; Label: Epic; Catalogue number: 477675.2 / 477676.2 (2CD)	7	46
Vicarious	Released: August 1996; Label: Columbia; Catalogue number: 485270.2	4	—
No New Messages	Released: April 2000; Label: Epic; Catalogue number: 495498.2	10	—
Count Backwards from 10	Released: August 2004; Label: Epic/CRS; Catalogue number: 5173692000	20	—
Knucklebones	Released: 4 August 2023; Label: Bigpop	21	—
"—" denotes a release that did not chart.

=== Remix albums ===
List of remix albums, with selected details and chart positions
Title	Details	Peak positions
Title	Details	NZ
100 Street Transistors	Released: July 1997; Label: Columbia; Catalog number: 487709.2	19

=== Compilation albums ===
List of compilation albums, with selected details and chart positions
Title	Details	Peak positions	Certification
Title	Details	NZ	Certification
The Best of 1990–2000	Released: November 2000; Label: Epic; Catalog number: 5011412000	26	RMNZ: Gold

=== Singles ===
List of singles, with selected chart positions
Title	Year	Peak chart positions		Album
Title	Year	NZ	AUS	Album
"Blue"	1988	—	—	Hemisphere
"One Good Reason"	1990	—	—	Hemisphere
"The Slide"	1991	—	—	Worldservice
"Love Explodes"	1992	—	—	Worldservice
"Have a Little Faith"	1992	36	—	Worldservice
"Trick with a Knife"	1994	16	37	Broadcast
"Crying"	1994	26	—	Broadcast
"Sweet Disorder"	1995	27	—	Broadcast
"Beautiful Skin"	1995	—	—	Broadcast
"Under the Milky Way"	1995	—	113	Broadcast
"Taller Than God"	1996	19	—	Vicarious
"Boxers"	1996	44	—	Vicarious
"Spoiler"	1997	47	—	Vicarious
"Sun Comes Up"	1997	—	—	100 Street Transistors
"Scared of Flying"	1999	45	—	No New Messages
"Drive"	2000	7	—	No New Messages
"It's Not Enough"	2000	—	—	No New Messages
"City Lights"	2000	—	—	No New Messages
"You've Been on My Mind"	2004	—	—	Count Backwards From 10
"Love My Way"	2004	—	—	Count Backwards From 10
"Wire"	2005	—	—	Count Backwards From 10

== Awards and nominations ==
=== Aotearoa Music Awards ===
The Aotearoa Music Awards (previously called the New Zealand Music Awards) recognise achievements in New Zealand music.

Year	Nominee / work	Award	Result	Ref.
1990	Hemisphere	Engineer of the Year	Won	
1990	Paul Middleditch - "One Good Reason" (Strawpeople)	Music Video of the Year	Nominated	
1990	Strawpeople	Most Promising Group	Won	
1994	World Service	Album of the Year	Nominated	
1994	Strawpeople	Group of the Year	Nominated	
1994	Strawpeople - World Service	Producer of the Year	Won	
1994	"Love Explodes"	Single of the Year	Nominated	
1995	Wayne Conway - Broadcast (Strawpeople)	Album Cover of the Year	Won	
1996	Mark Tierney / Paul Casserly / Anthony Ioasa - Sweet Disorder (Strawpeople)	Songwriter of the Year	Won	
1996	"Sweet Disorder"	Single of the Year	Nominated	
1997	Vicarious	Album of the Year	Won	
1997	Chris Van Der Geer (Strawpeople)	Engineer of the Year	Nominated	
1997	Fiona McDonald (Strawpeople)	Female of the Year	Nominated	
1997	Greg Johnson - "Boxers" (Strawpeople)	Songwriter of the Year	Nominated	
1997	"Taller Than God"	Single of the Year	Nominated	
2001	The Best of 1990-2000	Film Soundtrack / Cast Recording / Compilation of the Year	Won	
2001	Paul Casserly & Joost Langveld - No New Messages (Strawpeople)	Producer of the Year	Nominated	
