= Chris Matthews (New Zealand musician) =

New Zealand rock musician

- Born: New Zealand
- Genres: Rock, industrial
- Occupation(s): Musician, songwriter, producer
- Instrument(s): Vocals, guitar, keyboard, drums
- Years active: 1983–present
- Labels: Flying Nun, Robot Monkey

Chris Matthews is a New Zealand rock musician. He has been a member of numerous bands, notably Children's Hour, This Kind of Punishment and The Headless Chickens for whom he was guitarist and lead vocalist, as well as writer or co-writer of many of their songs. Among these was the 1991 single "Cruise Control", co-written by Matthews and Michael Lawry, which was voted by APRA's members as the 76th greatest New Zealand song of all time.

In 2008, he formed Chris Matthews and Robot Monkey Orchestra and released the album The Map of love, a cycle of songs based on the poems of Dylan Thomas.

== Discography ==
=== With Children's Hour ===
- Flesh (1983) Flying Nun Records
- Ya! Ya! Ya! (1984) Flying Nun Records
- Looking For the Sun (2005) Failsafe Records

=== With Headless Chickens ===
- Stunt Clown (1988) Flying Nun Records
- Body Blow (1991) Flying Nun Records
- Greedy (1997) Flying Nun Records

=== With Chris Matthews & Robot Monkey Orchestra ===
- The Map of Love (2008) Robot Monkey Records
