= Fiona McDonald =

New Zealand pop singer and TV personality

- Born: Fiona Maude McDonald; 1965 (age 60–61); Huntly, New Zealand
- Origin: Auckland, New Zealand
- Genres: Alternative rock, electronic
- Occupations: Singer, songwriter, musician, model, TV presenter
- Instrument: Keyboards
- Years active: 1988–2000
- Label: Flying Nun

Fiona Maude McDonald (born 1965) is a New Zealand pop singer and television personality.

== Singer ==
McDonald's first involvement with music came through singing jingles for Auckland student radio station bFM. From that work she was asked to join Auckland band Diatribe which also included musician Greg Johnson. In the early '90s she teamed up with former bFM producers Mark Tierney and Paul Casserly who were looking for a singer for their new studio-only group, Strawpeople.

McDonald also briefly sang live with NRA, and provided guest vocals on the Headless Chickens on "Cruise Control". Reaching #6 in the charts, "Cruise Control" proved to be so popular that she was asked to join the band full-time. Three successful years of recording and touring followed, including number one single "George", but McDonald eventually left the band in 1995.

In the mid-'90s, McDonald continued to work with Strawpeople and at the same time worked on songs for her solo album. A Different Hunger was released in 1999 with the first single "Sin Again" making it to #7 in the New Zealand charts.

== Television ==
McDonald's first television work was in 1997 presenting @Xtra, a TV2 series about the internet. In 2005 McDonald was also one of the three judges in the first series of NZ Idol and presented the New Zealand version of 10 Years Younger. She also presented the second series of arts show The Big Art Trip. In October 2012, she began work as a presenter on the new Shopping Channel.

== Discography ==
=== Strawpeople ===
- Hemisphere (1991) Pagan Records
- Worldservice (1992) Pagan Records
- Broadcast (1994) Epic Records
- Vicarious (1996) Columbia Records
- Knucklebones (2023) Bigpop

=== Headless Chickens ===
- Body Blow (1991) Flying Nun Records
- Greedy (1997) Flying Nun Records

=== Album ===
- A Different Hunger (1999)

=== Singles ===
Year	Title	Peak chart positions	Album
Year	Title	NZ	Album
1999	"Sin Again"	7	A Different Hunger
1999	"Damage Control"	18	A Different Hunger
1999	"Breathe"	-	A Different Hunger
1999	"Wish I Was A Man"	-	A Different Hunger
1999	"Bless Them All"	20	Non-album single
1999	"Let Me Dream"	-	A Different Hunger
2000	"Bury Me"	-	A Different Hunger
2000	"I Don't Care"	-	A Different Hunger
