= The Jordan Boys' Legacy =

- Lanterns episode
- Episode no.: Episode 7
- Directed by: Alik Sakharov
- Written by: Damon Lindelof; Tom King
- Cinematography by: Armando Salas
- Editing by: Matthew V. Colonna
- Original air date: September 27, 2026
- Running time: 47 minutes

Guest appearances
- Jason Ritter as Billy Macon; Shea Pritchard as Noah Macon; J. Alphonse Nicholson as John Stewart Sr.; Jared Grimes as Marcus Stewart; Romeo Brown as Aaron Stewart; Hannah Christine Shetler as Maggie; Jake B. Miller as Martin Jordan

Episode chronology
← Previous "Bad Optics"	Next → "Dirt and Stars"

"The Jordan Boys' Legacy" is the seventh episode of the American superhero television series Lanterns, set in the DC Universe (DCU). The episode was written by series co-creators Damon Lindelof and Tom King, and directed by Alik Sakharov. It was first broadcast on HBO in the United States on September 27, 2026, and also was available on HBO Max on the same date.

The series follows experienced Lantern Hal Jordan and new recruit John Stewart as they investigate a murder in Rushville, Nebraska, which Jordan believes is an extraterrestrial incident and leads them to darker mysteries and reckonings. In the episode, John uses Hal's hologram to gain access to the vault, while also trying to find more information about Hal's killer.

According to Nielsen Media Research, the episode was seen by an estimated 0.64 million household viewers and gained a 0.15 ratings share among adults aged 18–49. The episode received extremely positive reviews, who praised the episode's script, emotional stakes, character development, and performances.

== Plot ==
In 1975, a young Hal gets in trouble for refusing to give up a baseball, causing his team to forfeit a game and he is beaten by his teammates. His father Martin refuses to let him apologize and he fights with the team coach. He gives Hal a small key to his personal safe, as his own father once did, asking him to keep the "Jordan boys' legacy" alive despite the problems they could face. Some time later, Martin dies and Hal attends his funeral.

In 2026, John tells Hal's hologram that he was murdered and that he is not currently Earth's Green Lantern, asking him to help solve his murder. He wants the hologram to open Hal's storage vault via voice activation, but the hologram refuses as he still wants to know more about the past years. When John tells him about Kerry and her relationship with Hal, the hologram demands to meet her, refusing to open the vault otherwise.

At a ceremony for Noah's college selection, John takes Kerry aside and summons the hologram, causing her to become emotional. She agrees to help them with the investigation. The hologram, however, privately tells John he suspects Kerry of murdering Hal, interpreting her tearful reaction to his appearance as guilt, and he and John decide to visit the vault without her.

The hologram opens the vault, which contains bags of supplies that include a portable wormhole that leads to another planet. They visit the planet, discovering it to be an arid desert containing countless fossilized skeletons, as well as a giant city floating in the sky that Hal's hologram confirms is abandoned. John realizes that the bones belong to Antaan's species, recalling the vision Antaan showed him of a fear-inducing gas sent by the Manhunters that drove his people to kill each other and leap to their deaths from the sky. (Note: As seen in "Trust Fall", which depicts John witnessing the vision, though its contents are not revealed until this episode.) The two spot an empty rowboat floating in a foggy lake in the distance; John rows the boat towards a glowing structure on the other side of the lake, and is soon haunted by memories of his father and his younger self. He panics and takes out his gun, but the hologram throws him into the water before pulling him back out, revealing that John had actually pointed the gun at himself. John realizes that the fog surrounding the lake contains the same gas that drove Antaan's species to their deaths. The incident prompts Hal's hologram to reveal that that Hal's father Martin committed suicide, as did Martin's own father; their depression was believed to be passed down and known as the "Jordan boys' legacy". John realizes the hologram believes Hal may have killed himself, and expresses sympathy for Hal's traumatic past.

The two eventually reach the structure, a refinery-like building. Inside, they are attacked by a hooded cloaked figure, who John easily subdues. They unmask him, revealing him to be Sinestro.

== Production ==
=== Development ===
The episode was written by Lanterns co-creators Damon Lindelof and Tom King, and directed by Alik Sakharov. It marked Lindelof's third writing credit, King's second writing credit, and Sakharov's first directing credit for the series.

=== Writing ===
Aaron Pierre explained John Stewart's new relationship with Hal Jordan's hologram and Hal himself, "I think his understanding of who Hal is certainly evolves over the course of the series. It's almost like throughout these episodes, John is putting together a puzzle, but the puzzle is 1000 pieces, and sometimes elements of that puzzle form before others, and he thinks he has an understanding of exactly who Hal is, and then he formulates another part of the puzzle, and that conflicts with what he thought he understood, and it's an ongoing thing". He further added, "He may never understand all of the nuances of who this individual is, but he can discover who this man is at his core. And once that curiosity was satisfied, I think he was very at peace with everything that the two of them had been through — the highs, the lows, the inbetweens, the moments that felt like purgatory. I think he just he just finds peace with it, because he knows who this individual is at his core, no matter what decoration or nuances surround it".

In regards to the Halogram displaying key flashbacks of Hal's youth, Kyle Chandler noted how these delve into Hal's character, history and darkness, exploring more his pathology and how there's a lot going between Hal and John as Hal had a rough upbringing before getting his ring due to his family's past and his childhood. In a diversion from comic book's origin story, Hal's father Martin Jordan is revealed to not have crashed his test plane accidentally but on purpose due to being convinced his family they would be better off without him and the worsening pain he couldn't hide anymore as Hal finds out from the note he left for him, much like Hal's grandfather before him. Showrunner Chris Mundy came up with the plot twist of the Jordan family as shooting was about to start so Chandler could have enough time to brilliantly incorporate his character's turmoil from the beginning into his performance, despite Lindelof's concerns about playing around the source material's canon before reuniting with King and the writers' room and concluding that, because of Martin's importance in Hal's origins, they should include his death nonetheless much like how integral murder of Batman's parents and the destruction of Superman's planet are but recontextualizing it to interrogate Hal's fearlessness or lack thereof to carve out their own story.

Kelly Macdonald explained Kerry's reaction to Hal's hologram, "It's tricky because Hal Jordan's still Hal Jordan, but it's working with somebody so professional and brilliant at their job as Chandler. He walked on, and just one look in his eyes, and he was not the person that's got a history with Kerry, and so it just made it really easy. It was easy and emotional. The scripts allowed for all sorts of things to be going on in Kerry's mind, because she's feeling everything at once".

== Reception ==
=== Viewers ===
In its original American broadcast, "The Jordan Boys' Legacy" was seen by an estimated 0.64 million household viewers with a 0.15 in the 18–49 demographics. This means that 0.15 percent of all households with televisions watched the episode. This was a 16% increase in viewership from the previous episode, which was watched by an estimated 0.55 million household viewers with a 0.14 in the 18–49 demographics.

=== Critical reviews ===
"The Jordan Boys' Legacy" received extremely positive reviews from critics. Jesse Schedeen of IGN gave the episode a "great" 8 out of 10 and wrote in his verdict, "Lanterns rebuilds its lost momentum in the penultimate chapter of Season 1. This episode makes full use of the Halogram to restore the essential Hal/John dynamic that was mostly missing in Episode 6. It also provides compelling new insight into Hal's character, revealing how Earth's first Lantern was motivated less by fearlessness than a deep sense of depression. There's a lot of ground for the series to cover in the finale, but things are definitely looking up right now."

Dennis Perkins of The A.V. Club gave the episode a "B+" grade and wrote, "It makes sense that Lanterns could only give us what we wanted once one of the main characters was dead. “The Jordan Boys” plays with those expectations — and meets them — while maintaining the series' tone of regret and loss and time irrevocably gone."

Siddhant Adlakha of Vulture gave the episode a perfect 5 star rating out of 5 and wrote, "No matter where things go in the season finale — no matter who it turns out broke Sinestro loose, or who killed Hal Jordan, or whatever else is happening with the mystery plot — these mechanics are all firmly rooted in some of the most piercing, powerful drama of any live-action story based on a DC comic. Sure, the answers will probably matter, and the possibilities could be varying degrees of satisfying or disappointing. But emotionally speaking, Lanterns has almost certainly already stuck the landing." Ben Travers of IndieWire gave the episode an "A–" grade and wrote, "In addition to Hal writing a new legacy for his family, the other implication from Lanterns emotional penultimate episode is that there's a new Jordan boy in town. John may have grown up hating Hal, and Hal may have treated John like dirt during their brief time together. But in echoing his father's words on that fateful day at the airfield, the Hal-o-gram cements his place as John's de facto father figure."

Joe George of Den of Geek gave the episode a 4 star rating out of 5 and wrote, "At this point, I wouldn't bet against Lanterns. One wobbly episode aside, the series has been consistently surprising and compelling, even as it heads into the finale. Given everything tricky about selling Green Lantern lore to a mass audience, and given the complaints that surrounded the marketing around the show, the excellence of Lanterns has been nothing short of magical." Sean T. Collins of Decider was less enthusiastic about the scenes focused on Hal's childhood, writing, "Lanterns is now officially 0 for 2 when it comes to flashbacks revealing the secret histories of Hal Jordan and John Stewart. Fortunately, its track record in the present remains largely unblemished."

Eric Francisco of Esquire wrote, "I don't know how a show like Lanterns can introduce more spectrum colors without exploding into a different show entirely. And with only one episode to go this season, there are bigger mysteries to solve, like who actually killed Hal Jordan. I admit I'm a little worried Lanterns is going full speed in a direction that I don't think it has earned yet. But a show featuring a powerful zombie army that's primed to kill everyone and everything is surprisingly on-brand for HBO." Michael John Petty of Collider gave the episode a 7 out of 10 rating and wrote, "It took seven episodes, but Lanterns finally delivers a glimpse of something most fans wanted from the beginning: two Green Lantern icons cooperating with one another to achieve a shared goal."

Noel Murray of The New York Times wrote, "This week's Lanterns episode dives deeper into Hal's past than any other episode this season. It is, in a roundabout way, a counterpart to the John Stewart origin episode “OutKast.” Unlike that episode, this one has only one long flashback, set in 1975. But the whole story is really about what has made Hal who he is." Denis Kimathi of TV Fanatic gave the episode a 4 star rating out of 5 and wrote, "Lanterns risks becoming one of those shows propped up by great acting, writing, and production value, even when the story or pacing leaves a lot to be desired. Lanterns Season 1's reputation hinges on delivering an explosive season finale."
