= The Weenie =

- Lanterns episode
- Episode no.: Episode 4
- Directed by: Geeta Vasant Patel
- Written by: Breannah Gibson
- Cinematography by: Armando Salas
- Editing by: Matthew V. Colonna; Vikash Patel
- Original air date: September 6, 2026
- Running time: 52 minutes

Guest appearances
- Laura Linney as Lianna; J. Alphonse Nicholson as John Stewart Sr. (voice); Paul Ben-Victor as Antaan; Jason Manuel Olazabal as Hector Gutierrez; Jasmine Cephas Jones as Bernadette Stewart (voice)

Episode chronology
← Previous "OutKast"	Next → "Lights Out"

"The Weenie" is the fourth episode of the American superhero television series Lanterns, set in the DC Universe (DCU). The episode was written by producer Breannah Gibson, and directed by Geeta Vasant Patel. It was first broadcast on HBO in the United States on September 6, 2026, and also was available on HBO Max on the same date.

The series follows experienced Lantern Hal Jordan and new recruit John Stewart as they investigate a murder in Rushville, Nebraska, which Jordan believes is an extraterrestrial incident and leads them to darker mysteries and reckonings. In the episode, Hal questions Sinestro about the Manhunters, while John is asked by the Guardians to move faster with their plan.

According to Nielsen Media Research, the episode was seen by an estimated 0.39 million household viewers and gained a 0.08 ratings share among adults aged 18–49. The episode received mostly positive reviews from critics, who praised the performances, cast chemistry and plot revelations in the episode.

== Plot ==
In 2016, Hal visits Thaal Sinestro in a prison off-world to learn about the Manhunters, but Sinestro asks about John. He questions Hal's claim that he is just a backup, making Hal admit that John is his replacement. Sinestro states that Manhunters are near extinct, and suggests that if Hal delivers the one Manhunter to the Guardians, they will spare him.

On Earth, John goes to a gun store to buy a rifle, only to remove the scope and use it to surveil Will Macon's compound. When Hal returns, John surmises that the Manhunter might be in the compound at a central location he calls a weenie, where a helicopter arrives at the exact same hour every day. They confide the information to Kerry, theorizing that Macon's benefactor might be the Manhunter. In his motel room, John is visited by Lianna, who reveals Hal lied about his space trip and states that when Hal gives him the ring, he has to recite the Oath to officially replace him as the Sector's Green Lantern. John is apprehensive at first but Lianna pushes him towards the decision.

To sneak in the compound, John uses the Ring to create a drill that digs a tunnel. Inside the compound, they find a secret room with high-tech weapons of alien origin. However, Hal accidentally activates an alarm and they are captured by the militia wielding guns that disperse a black smoke that hinders the Ring. They are brought before Macon, who undresses and makes John draw him, while revealing that his benefactor the Manhunter is actually his boss. In exchange for protection from the Guardians, the Manhunter healed everyone in Rushville, including Macon, who was dying of cancer. Hal refuses to stop, but Kerry arrives to escort them out. At his room, John is visited by Zoe and they have sex. Afterwards, she cryptically claims that Macon owes her for saving his life, and warns John to leave town, but he refuses. As Zoe drives away, her truck is destroyed by a laser from space.

Hal retrieves the satellite responsible for the laser. With Kerry's help, they deduce it belongs to the company Atlas, Inc., owned by Hector Hammond. Hal and John visit a nearby slaughterhouse owned by Hammond, finding that he uses lasers to kill cows. They find Hammond, who warns that if they kill him, he will launch a satellite to kill John's parents via dead man's switch. Hammond also reveals a secret recording of John's conversation with Lianna, prompting an angry Hal to threaten him until he deactivates the satellite. The man reveals he is not actually Hammond, but an engineer named Hector Gutierrez, who was offered advanced technology and instructed to pretend to be Hammond in the interrogation. Gutierrez claims the Manhunter is Macon himself.

On the drive back to the motel, Hal states he forgives John, revealing that he has deduced that Zoe is the real Manhunter (based on John's muted reaction to her apparent death) and accuses John of keeping his suspicions from him. Hal gets John to contact Antaan to confirm the Manhunter was found to schedule a meeting. Afterwards, he jumps out of the car, causing it to crash into a pole with John still inside.

== Production ==
=== Development ===
The episode was written by producer Breannah Gibson, and directed by Geeta Vasant Patel. It marked Gibson's first writing credit, and Patel's first directing credit in Lanterns.

=== Writing ===
Ulrich Thomsen said that he approached his performance as Sinestro in a "normal" and "a little more human" way, contrasting Mark Strong's performance in the 2011 film, stating "I tend not to look too much on other things that have been done. It just confuses me. I'm arrogant enough just to trust my instincts and talk to the directors and showrunners and stuff like that". He also added over his scene with Hal Jordan, "You have your best of enemies, right, and that's always fun. But in order to play that, it should be in the scenes. Otherwise it would be difficult. But it was well written that way".

Poorna Jagannathan was unaware that her character was the Manhunter until she was given the script for the episode, and felt "blindsided" about the reveal because she thought it would be a man. She added, "The truth is they really tried to humanize this Manhunter, who is a victim of what the Guardians have created, a victim of her programming, a victim of perception. So they really wanted this Manhunter to feel human emotions, and yet her programming will always get the better of her, even at times that she doesn't want it. So I was struck by how much humanity they imbued in even the character that's supposed to be the most evil".

=== Filming ===
The episode features a scene where Garret Dillahunt strips himself naked and has John Stewart draw him. Dillahunt commented, "There's a lot going on in that scene, a lot of jives and weirdness. I love the discomfort of Hal in particular. I think Aaron was sick that day, but he championed through anyway, and you can't even tell". He also added, "It was a bit of surprise that it was going to happen at this stage of my life. I thought those days were over... But I did appreciate that I had a few months to get in shape".

There was a scene where Macon would try the Ring, but it was cut from the final version, explaining "It's like I'm trying to manifest being tricky in this small little moment, but he's trying to be the biggest swinging thing in the room and piss a circle around his wife. I guess he hasn't been able to divorce himself from all the frailties of humanity. He's a little jealous".

== Reception ==
=== Viewers ===
In its original American broadcast, "The Weenie" was seen by an estimated 0.39 million household viewers with a 0.08 in the 18–49 demographics. This means that 0.12 percent of all households with televisions watched the episode. This was a 44% decrease in viewership from the previous episode, which was watched by an estimated 0.69 million household viewers with a 0.18 in the 18–49 demographics.

=== Critical reviews ===
"The Weenie" received mostly positive reviews from critics. Jesse Schedeen of IGN gave the episode a "good" 7 out of 10 and wrote in his verdict, "The fourth episode of Lanterns takes a somewhat frustrating turn. Even though this episode features some major Green Lantern villains, it doesn't do nearly enough to take advantage of those characters. Luckily, the series still has the core Hal Jordan/John Stewart dynamic to fall back upon. "The Weenie" succeeds both in highlighting their amusing banter and in building a real sense of tension as the two men pursue their competing agendas. All signs point to a very exciting and dramatic Episode 5."

Dennis Perkins of The A.V. Club gave the episode a "B+" grade and wrote, "this approach does seem antithetical to the Green Lantern vibe. But it is a considered choice to ground (in all senses) this latest outpost in the suddenly shaky James Gunn DCU in character over spectacle, and with such strong performers (Kerry Macdonald making a co-equal third in the series' leading trio), the incongruity is working. It might not be what people expected, but Lanterns continues to be its own, admirably singular thing."

Siddhant Adlakha of Vulture gave the episode a 4 star rating out of 5 and wrote, "The fourth episode of Lanterns charges forward at light speed, making for an intense entry that, though it exposes the series' structural flaws, proves just how easily it can overcome them through potent drama. Its fine-tuned performances are key, starting with a return to the cliffhanger from two weeks ago, wherein Hal Jordan covertly confronts his imprisoned former mentor, Sinestro, who both guides and manipulates him in the style of Hannibal Lecter." Joe George of Den of Geek gave the episode a 4 star rating out of 5 and wrote, "With all of these alien forces converging on Hal and John in Rushville, one gets the sense that Lanterns is ready to embrace the extreme parts of the Green Lantern mythos. After all, "The Weenie" does put Hal in his suit for the most screen time. Yet, the episode also wisely focuses on the building and rupturing friendship between Hal and John, proving that no matter how many robots from outer space or pink-skinned criminals they may encounter, the heroes of Lanterns are all too human."

Michael John Petty of Collider gave the episode a 8 out of 10 rating and wrote, "In a town full of secrets and lies, only Hal and John stand between the Nebraskan heartland and total annihilation — the question is, will they finally learn to trust one another? Episode 4 suggests that trust may be harder to come by than power rings." Eric Francisco of Esquire wrote, "While less thought-provoking than last week, "The Weenie" works like Stewart's smooth schematics. It's a plot-centric installment that feels like a necessary step forward after weeks of setup and one week dedicated to the main character's backstory. All of which are necessary, yes, but it's nice that the HBO superhero show actually has the good guys (using that term loosely here) doing what they should be: stopping bad guys."

Noel Murray of The New York Times wrote, "Even though Lanterns is a cross between a superhero adventure and a buddy cop comedy, the show's writers seemed, for the first three episodes, to be going out of their way to keep the buddies apart and the super heroics to a minimum. That changed with this week's episode. Earth's current Green Lantern and his would-be replacement are side-by-side for the whole hour, working together on an out-and-out caper, complete with power ring antics and repartee." Denis Kimathi of TV Fanatic gave the episode a 4.5 star rating out of 5 and wrote, ""The Weenie" doesn't break new ground as far as the general mystery is concerned, but it's a fun time nonetheless. Hal Jordan has been carrying the fun part of it for the past three episodes, but John rises to the occasion and feels like a balanced character in the process."
