= Trust Fall (Lanterns) =

- Lanterns episode
- Episode no.: Episode 2
- Directed by: James Hawes
- Written by: Vanessa Baden Kelly; Chris Mundy
- Cinematography by: Florian Hoffmeister
- Editing by: Robert Abilez; Vikash Patel
- Original air date: August 23, 2026
- Running time: 51 minutes

Guest appearances
- Jason Ritter as Billy Macon; Paul Ben-Victor as Antaan

Episode chronology
← Previous "Pilot"	Next → "OutKast"

"Trust Fall" is the second episode of the American superhero television series Lanterns, set in the DC Universe (DCU). The episode was written by co-executive producer Vanessa Baden Kelly and series co-creator Chris Mundy, and directed by executive producer James Hawes. It was first broadcast on HBO in the United States on August 23, 2026, and also was available on HBO Max on the same date.

The series follows experienced Lantern Hal Jordan and new recruit John Stewart as they investigate a murder in Rushville, Nebraska, which Jordan believes is an extraterrestrial incident and leads them to darker mysteries and reckonings. In the episode, Hal assigns John to retrieve his Lantern in Coast City to charge his ring, while he continues his investigation.

According to Nielsen Media Research, the episode was seen by an estimated 0.56 million household viewers and gained a 0.12 ratings share among adults aged 18–49. The episode received mostly positive reviews from critics, with critics praising the performances, character development and the final scene.

== Plot ==
In 2016, Hal decides to give a new training lesson to John; he gives him his ring, and instructs him to use his instincts to fly. While John is unable to fly, they are astonished to see that he manifested a green bird. Hal then assigns John to take a plane to Coast City and retrieve his Lantern to charge his ring, while forcing him to keep the bird alive. Soon after, Hal's ring runs out of energy, leaving him powerless.

With the Rushville townspeople distrusting of Hal during the town meeting, he decides to retrieve the corpses of the mass shooting to use as reference in the football field. At the football field, he notices the detectors that go off in the presence of the corpses. Afterwards, he is discovered and Kerry confronts him. When he states he wants to take the corpses to William's ranch, she accompanies him. William refuses to cooperate, and has a sniper shoot Hal when he refuses to leave. At the hospital, Kerry says she heard him utter the name "Sinestro" in his sleep, but Hal refuses to talk about him. While leaving the hospital, Hal is confused that the equipment is unused and that there are very few patients.

In Coast City, John finds the Lantern in Hal's vault, which is revealed to be a pocket universe. He also is forced to feed Hal's live plant Earl beef and bison. On his way out, he is abducted by three men. Despite trying to escape in a highway, he is kidnapped again when a black van slams into him sideways. John is brought before Antaan, an extraterrestrial who demands to know about Manhunters, a synthetic race responsible for genocide against their species. While a Lantern (implied to be Abin Sur) was sent to execute the Manhunter, they believe he is still alive and hiding in Rushville. Antaan also reveals that the victims at the mass shooting and Waylon Sanders were his own men sent to find the Manhunter. They release John and give him 48 hours to locate the Manhunter or they will intervene on Rushville.

Returning to Rushville with the bird, John runs into Zoe at a diner. She reiterates she does not regret their one-night stand and states she loves William. He goes to his motel to meet with Hal, giving him the Lantern to recharge his ring. John then asks about the Manhunters, revealing the threat that Antaan gave him.

After John deconstructs the bird and heads into the hotel room, Hal puts on his suit and flies off-world to visit Sinestro in prison. He asks about the Manhunters, with Sinestro telling him that if one still exists it would be the second greatest threat he’s currently facing. Sinestro in turn asks Hal about John.

== Production ==
=== Development ===
The episode was written by co-executive producer Vanessa Baden Kelly and Lanterns co-creator Chris Mundy, and directed by executive producer James Hawes. It marked Kelly's first writing credit, Mundy's second writing credit, and Hawes' second directing credit.

=== Writing ===
Mundy said that Hal Jordan's decision to suit up and fly to visit Sinestro was indicative of a phrase said by Hal in the prior episode, "When and where to use the ring is the whole ballgame". He said, "We wanted to earn the times we used it in a big way. We start small and start kind of playful with the $20 bill and all those kinds of things, so that each time we used it, people trusted us, like, 'Oh, they're not just plastering everything with it all the time.' It's those characters [deciding when to use it], and then because of that, those writers who are making those characters do that thing, they know when to employ it and when not to".

The ending introduces Sinestro, a key figure in the comics. Damon Lindelof said that "the idea that Sinestro is out there is really, really important to understanding who Hal is. No one is gonna be able to poke at Hal's reluctance to cede the ring more than Sinestro will". Mundy said that they were inspired by The Silence of the Lambs (1991) to use Sinestro, "We wanted him in the show just because of his place in the mythology. But by nature of the fact that we were telling a mystery more than we were telling a thriller, we don't really have a big bad in the season. We have mysteries [where] there might be something malevolent behind them or not, and there's a mystery of people's identities or who did what, but it's not 'we're fighting this bad guy, and he's gonna destroy the world.' So in this weird way, it freed us up. We could use him sparingly".

The episode reveals that Kerry is not from Rushville, but from Gotham City. Kelly Macdonald then worked with Hawes on her "Gotham accent", explaining "we imagine Gotham as an east coast, North American metropolis, but she's been in Nebraska for a while, [so] just a little bit more enigmatic".

== Reception ==
=== Viewers ===
In its original American broadcast, "Trust Fall" was seen by an estimated 0.56 million household viewers with a 0.12 in the 18–49 demographics. This means that 0.12 percent of all households with televisions watched the episode. This was a 12% decrease in viewership from the previous episode, which was watched by an estimated 0.63 million household viewers with a 0.13 in the 18–49 demographics.

=== Critical reviews ===
"Trust Fall" received mostly positive reviews from critics. On the review aggregator Rotten Tomatoes, it holds an approval rating of 100% based on 10 reviews, with an average rating of 7.7/10.

Jesse Schedeen of IGN gave the episode a "great" 8 out of 10 and wrote in his verdict, "Lanterns continues to impress in its sophomore episode, proving that Kyle Chandler's Hal and Aaron Pierre's John are just as entertaining apart as they are together. Hal's chaotic but surprisingly fruitful detective work is a treat to watch, as is John's side quest back in Coast City. This episode makes terrific use of Kelly Macdonald's Sheriff Kerry as the third wheel in their investigation, and it manages to reveal just enough about the true scope of the show's central murder mystery to keep things interesting."

William Hughes of The A.V. Club gave the episode a "B+" grade and wrote, "All the True Detective/prestige-drama pretensions of this newest entrant to James Gunn's DCU suggest a Hal-like aversion to standard superhero wonder. But this episode lays in hints that we're not to take Hal's outward cynicism at face value."

Siddhant Adlakha of Vulture gave the episode a 3 star rating out of 5 and wrote, "The pilot's mounting mysteries and climactic cliffhanger might have felt like promises of something shocking. That may still be the case in the coming weeks, but the second episode of HBO's Lanterns makes for a fairly solid (if simple and straightforward) follow-up with some wildly entertaining moments."

Joe George of Den of Geek gave the episode a 4 star rating out of 5 and wrote, "is that enough for people who want to see aliens and superheroes in a Green Lantern show? For some, a bunch of normal people pretending to be aliens and fight sequences that involve kicking and punching, but no constructs, may answer, “No,” even after we get our first look at Ulrich Thomsen as a properly diabolical Sinestro. But for this long-time Green Lantern reader, Lanterns's desire to be both human and superheroic works, if only because a falling Hal Jordan, unpowered but unfearful, showed me that the human part of a Green Lantern story is just as important as the weird aliens." Michael John Petty of Collider gave the episode a 7 out of 10 rating and wrote, "If there's one thing this episode of Lanterns wants us to understand, it's that John Stewart is really, really important."

Erik Kain of Forbes wrote, "I did do some homework, of course, and learned all about Sinestro and his significance to the Green Lantern stories, but I won't share any of that here. It's too spoilery, I suppose. But somehow this show needed to make that moment land for non-fans also and it just didn't at all for me. I'll try to be patient, but I don't think I should have to go read wikis after an episode to enjoy an episode of TV." Eric Francisco of Esquire wrote, "Stewart is more powerful than even he knows. His ability to create a living projection, in this case a chirping bird, and to keep it alive without wearing a Power Ring is an incredible feat of willpower that is advanced even for most Green Lanterns. It's no wonder that Sinestro has an interest in him. But first, Stewart will have to become a Green Lantern first. Personally, I can't wait to see and hear him recite the Oath."

Sean T. Collins of Decider wrote, "the core cast continues to exude charisma from every pore. Does it help that Kyle Chandler, Aaron Pierre, Kelly Macdonald, and Poorna Jagannathan are all really, really, really, ridiculously good-looking? Yes, but they also all have an easy, convincing chemistry. This is true even of Chandler and Pierre as Jordan and Stewart, whose relationship feels like the former finding out just how far he can push things before the latter finally snaps. As always, I'm hoping a giant green fist is involved." Noel Murray of The New York Times wrote, "That is a sign of how ready he is to be a Green Lantern. Not only does he have incredible willpower; he is also comfortable with having something odd hovering around him, unexplained."
