= Pilot (Lanterns) =

- Lanterns episode
- Episode no.: Episode 1
- Directed by: James Hawes
- Written by: Chris Mundy; Damon Lindelof; Tom King
- Cinematography by: Florian Hoffmeister
- Editing by: Vikash Patel
- Original air date: August 16, 2026
- Running time: 56 minutes

Guest appearances
- Jason Ritter as Billy Macon; Chris Coy as "Waylon Sanders"; J. Alphonse Nicholson as John Stewart Sr.

Episode chronology
← Previous —	Next → "Trust Fall"

"Pilot" is the series premiere of the American superhero television series Lanterns, set in the DC Universe (DCU) and based on the Hal Jordan and John Stewart incarnations of the DC Comics character Green Lantern. The episode was written by series creators Chris Mundy, Damon Lindelof and Tom King, and directed by executive producer James Hawes. It was first broadcast on HBO in the United States on August 16, 2026, and also was available on HBO Max on the same date.

The series follows experienced Lantern Hal Jordan and new recruit John Stewart as they investigate a murder in Rushville, Nebraska, which Jordan believes is an extraterrestrial incident and leads them to darker mysteries and reckonings.

According to Nielsen Media Research, the episode was seen by an estimated 0.63 million household viewers and gained a 0.13 ratings share among adults aged 18–49. The series premiere received mostly positive reviews from critics, who praised the performances of Kyle Chandler and Aaron Pierre, characters and production values.

== Plot ==
In 1996, Air Force veteran and test pilot Hal Jordan is Earth's first member of the Green Lantern Corps. A young John Stewart idolizes Hal, who conducts a 60 Minutes interview after revealing his existence to the public while intercepting a meteor over Victoria Falls ten years earlier. John lives in Coast City with his Marine father John Sr., who shoots an apple off his head in order to prove he has no fear.

In 2016, an adult John is being trained as a reserve Lantern and expresses annoyance at not yet wearing the ring. Hal jumps out of the car he is driving, forcing John to wear Hal's ring to save himself. On his way to meet him, the ring releases a "backup consciousness" of Hal, recorded in case of his death, which has not been updated in ten years. The consciousness sends Hal a message: "There's hail in Rushville, Nebraska." This prompts Hal to fly to Rushville, with John making his own way there.

In Rushville, Hal and John discover the aftermath of a mass shooting at a high school football game, but local Sheriff Kerry Kane asks them not to intervene. John spots a suspect at the scene, and the man is arrested, but Kerry refuses to let Hal interrogate him. At a bar, Hal recounts the day when he became a Green Lantern, taking the ring from a dying Abin Sur and accepting responsibility for Sector 2814. Hal picks a fight with a bar patron, hoping to get arrested so he can get close to the suspect. Instead, Kerry locks him in the station's broom closet. John flirts with an older woman at the bar, and they end up having sex.

At his hearing, Hal is defended by lawyer Billy Macon, Kerry's husband. Hal is released on bail by Billy's father, William, but is instructed not to leave town. William asks to meet Hal and John at a local ranch. William is taking care of the ranch for an undisclosed client, and believes Hal should interrogate the jailed suspect using his connection to Kerry. John finds the woman at the ranch and learns she is Zoe Macon, William's wife.

The following day, Hal interrogates the suspect, Waylon Sanders, who he believes may be an alien. Waylon confirms Hal's suspicions, taunting and angering him by reciting his oath, then activates an explosive device in his body. Hal quickly throws him to the ground and puts up a force field with his ring, containing the explosion and saving Rushville.

In 2026, John returns to Rushville and reunites with Kerry. At the football field, they discover Hal's corpse in the bleachers with his ring missing.

== Production ==
=== Development ===
The episode was written by Lanterns creators Chris Mundy, Damon Lindelof and Tom King, and directed by executive producer James Hawes.

=== Writing ===
Aaron Pierre said that the episode's focus on the relationship between Hal Jordan and John Stewart was essential to establish the stakes. He said that it was important to make a good impression with Kyle Chandler, "When we met for the first time, it was I think a relief for both of us, and a feeling of being energized and excited about developing this friendship that we now have".

The plot twist of Hal being killed off at the end of the episode was an idea co-creator Damon Lindelof, showrunner Chris Mundy and executive producer Tom King came up in early development to focus the show on John and was something that surprised them, with Lindelof believing that DC Studios wouldn't allow them to do that, a decision that Chandler praised for setting off the mystery despite Kelly Macdonald's discomfort due to her liking for Chandler. They had initially toyed with the idea of the murder victim being Sheriff Kerry Kane, but they ultimately felt that such decision would come off as "fridging" and disservice the character so it would be most meaningful and incredible if Hal died as it would provide them with "huge, significant emotional stakes" that reverberate universally, especially if he did when his relationship with John was unresolved in a similar vein to the relationship between the characters of Patrick Swayze and Demi Moore in Ghost (1990), which they were given permission to write. Although they didn't want to drag the season with the twist, they opted to drop the reveal in the episode to signal the audience where they are willing to go, though Mundy noted how Hal has died and revived previously in the source material's canon, hence the inclusion of the Halogram.

Regarding the episode's ending, wherein Hal's corpse is found without his ring, Lindelof said that this was done to emphasize their view that the series is about John, "although the show is called Lanterns and it is a buddy-cop construct, when you leave these episodes you're going to be leaving them with John Stewart. We want you to get your brains around that. We want you to know it coming in". Mundy admitted that the decision was "kind of big and scary", but "the fact that they had confidence or, really, faith in us at least to do it and treat it with the level of care that we hopefully gave it, we felt really lucky."

King added, "this is a show that we're trying to make as close to reality, and sometimes you lose the things you love, and sometimes the stakes are that high in reality, and they're supposed to be that high in our show". Chandler admitted surprise when he was given the script, but also felt "Oh, that's going to be a good show". He also expressed admiration for the concept, "The whole search is to find out what happened to him. I like the fact that the show is non-linear and they've layered it like that".

== Reception ==
=== Viewers ===
In its original American broadcast, "Pilot" was seen by an estimated 0.63 million household viewers with a 0.13 in the 18–49 demographics. This means that 0.13 percent of all households with televisions watched the episode.

The premiere attracted 9.3 million viewers worldwide during its first three days on HBO and HBO Max, including 6.6 million in the United States. Its U.S. premiere audience surpassed those of several recent HBO series, such as It: Welcome to Derry (2025–present) and The Penguin (2024), and became the biggest premiere for a DC Studios series on HBO Max.

=== Critical reviews ===
"Pilot" received mostly positive reviews from critics. On the review aggregator Rotten Tomatoes, it holds an approval rating of 100% based on 13 reviews, with an average rating of 7.6/10.

Jesse Schedeen of IGN gave the episode a "great" 8 out of 10 and wrote in his verdict, "With the DCU suddenly on shaky ground following the disastrous reception to Supergirl, it's reassuring to see Lanterns get off to such a strong start. It proves that there's indeed room for superhero stories in this cinematic universe that aren't all cut from the James Gunn cloth. While the central murder mystery in Episode 1 is more serviceable than actively intriguing, the characters and their uneasy dynamics more than justify giving the show a watch. Chandler's Hal Jordan and Pierre's John Stewart make for a mighty but very dysfunctional Dynamic Duo, and the prospect of spending seven more hours with them is exciting indeed."

William Hughes of The A.V. Club gave the episode a "B+" grade and wrote, "Lanterns cites procedural heavy hitters like True Detective (Mundy was a producer) and Slow Horses (the pilot's directed by that series' James Hawes) as inspirations, and those are some prestige heights for a superhero show to aim for. But the integration of those two dramatic spheres here feels well structured and deliberate. And Lanterns has Chandler, Macdonald, and Pierre, a formidable core clearly prepared to reveal some depths. As the DCU continues its fascinatingly diverse rollout, Lanterns suggests there's plenty of exciting new territory to color."

Siddhant Adlakha of Vulture gave the episode a 4 star rating out of 5 and wrote, "The result is a gritty saga that, although it starts off somewhat grounded, sets the stage for a cosmic mystery through entertaining twists and turns and has a gruff texture that isn’t limited to its heroes' frequent F-bombs."

Joe George of Den of Geek gave the episode a 4 star rating out of 5 and wrote, "If Lanterns can continue to give space for Chandler and Pierre to show off their skills and let Hal and John play off one another, keeping the sci-fi stuff present but not overwhelming, then the show can shine brighter than any other adaptation of the comic. But if the showrunners show fear and lean too hard into True Detective grittiness or comic book wackiness, well, it's going to be just one more superhero show that crashes and burns." Michael John Petty of Collider gave the episode a 8 out of 10 rating and wrote, "Rather than the usual intergalactic adventures, the series is a slow-burn take on the Green Lantern mythos that has been aptly described as akin to both True Detective and Training Day, with longtime superhero Hal Jordan showing newcomer John Stewart the ropes. It's an oddball take, to be sure, but there's certainly potential."

Erik Kain of Forbes wrote, "It's a bit of a messy opener for this new DC show. Not bad, necessarily, but not super great either." Eric Francisco of Esquire wrote, "Chandler and Pierre are still aces, and their corrosive relationship is what will hopefully beckon audiences back to Lanterns next week. Certainly, the circumstances behind the episode's shocking final image — Hal Jordan frozen dead on the same football bleachers just 10 years later — is enough to make the show appointment viewing. I'm just not sure what kind of TV show we'll be watching by the finale."

Sean T. Collins of Decider wrote, "Other than these unfortunate bum notes, Lanterns is a cleverly written show, engagingly acted by people I like watching. I'll render my final verdict the happy moment I see a giant green boxing glove, but until then, these space cops are still worth a ride-along." Chris Gallardo of Telltale TV gave the episode a 3.7 star rating out of 5 and wrote, "Not only does that explosive climax at the end work, but it creates a satisfying setup of this mystery that Hal and John have to solve. Overall, Lanterns Season 1 Episode 1 is a confident introduction to this earthly mystery and Hal and John's messy mentorship dynamic."

Noel Murray of The New York Times wrote, "The pilot episode does a lot of heavy lifting without ever seeming laborious. In addition to introducing the main characters and the central plot — involving mysterious murders in the tiny town of Rushville, Neb. — the first episode hints at the larger scope of the story, which stretches across several decades and raises questions about who really deserves to be a Green Lantern." Denis Kimathi of TV Fanatic gave the episode a 3.5 star rating out of 5 and wrote, "The premiere tests my patience a bit because it feels like it's trying to do too much at once. This is a common problem with many pilot episodes where they don't just let things breathe. However, it successfully creates a lot of interest in seeing how things play out."

=== Accolades ===
TVLine named Kyle Chandler the "Performer of the Week" for the week of August 22, 2026, for his performance in the episode. The site wrote, "It can be tough for an actor to break out of his niche once he's played an iconic TV role, and Kyle Chandler certainly played one as the hard-nosed but sensitive high school football coach Eric Taylor on Friday Night Lights. But Chandler is expanding his acting palette as grizzled superhero Hal Jordan on HBO's Lanterns, channeling some of Coach Taylor's mentor mystique while finding a playful new spin on it. He hit the ground running in this week's series premiere, too, as Hal invited John (and us) into the world of being a superhero."
