= OutKast (Lanterns) =

- Lanterns episode
- Episode no.: Episode 3
- Directed by: Stephen Williams
- Written by: Vanessa Baden Kelly
- Cinematography by: Gregory Middleton
- Editing by: Emily E. Greene
- Original air date: August 30, 2026
- Running time: 53 minutes

Guest appearances
- Laura Linney as Lianna; J. Alphonse Nicholson as John Stewart Sr.; Mark Damon Espinoza as Chavez; Jasmine Cephas Jones as Bernadette Stewart

Episode chronology
← Previous "Trust Fall"	Next → "The Weenie"

"OutKast" is the third episode of the American superhero television series Lanterns, set in the DC Universe (DCU). The episode was written by co-executive producer Vanessa Baden Kelly, and directed by Stephen Williams. It was first broadcast on HBO in the United States on August 30, 2026, and also was available on HBO Max on the same date.

The series follows experienced Lantern Hal Jordan and new recruit John Stewart as they investigate a murder in Rushville, Nebraska, which Jordan believes is an extraterrestrial incident and leads them to darker mysteries and reckonings. In the episode, John's past is explored as he is interviewed by a Guardian of the Universe over becoming the new Green Lantern.

According to Nielsen Media Research, the episode was seen by an estimated 0.69 million household viewers and gained a 0.18 ratings share among adults aged 18–49. The episode received mostly positive reviews from critics, who praised the themes, focus on John's origins and performances, but some criticized the lack of progression in the overarching mystery plot.

== Plot ==
In a flashback in 2016, John arrives at an empty mall for an "interview" with a woman. While escorting another man out, the woman has him wait in her office for a whole day, and expresses surprise that he stayed over. The woman, Lianna, is a member of the Guardians of the Universe, and they are looking for a new Green Lantern.

John states he was already chosen, recalling how his father was approached some years ago but was not selected due to his fear. John Sr. grew paranoid and upset when Hal is selected as the first Lantern from Earth. Bernadette considers leaving him, when she is approached by Lianna with a diamond. After making her see her true alien form, Bernadette talks to her about her intentions, and Lianna says that John could be a good candidate one day if he grows up to become fearless. She shares this with John Sr., and both set out to make John fearless. When John turns 5, his parents inform him of their plans and why they have to train him. Over the following years, John asks to do increasingly dangerous training methods, such as asking his father to shoot an apple off his head.

John then talks about his past as a sergeant major. He was approached by a superior to kill Arkady Ivanovich "Gray Wolf" Petrov, a money launderer hiding in the Kamchatka Peninsula. He oversaw Arkady's house for nine months in the woods, until he finally showed up. Before John could shoot, he sees Hal use a field to retrieve Arkady. John's superior reveals that Hal got the information from the Deputy Secretary of Defense and took Arkady to Guantanamo Bay. To avoid a potential conflict, John is dishonorably discharged from the Marines who covered up the incident.

While moping at his parents' home, John's mother applied on his behalf for art school, which he then gets an acceptance letter and takes classes. A professor informs him he's being considered for a special project and asks him to sketch the building from memory. After which, he asks him to consider a watch from his mother or father. As John is about to sketch it, he holds out a Green Lantern ring and tells him to construct it and consider its internal mechanism. John realizes the recruiter is a Guardian. After John puts on the ring to manifest his father's watch, the recruiter leads him to jump into a hole-portal he creates on the floor to his "interview".

Lianna states that Hal was warned not to use his power to intervene with terrestrial disputes, so she asks him if he wants to replace Hal, under the guise that Hal believes he is just a protégé. John accepts. When he visits his parents to inform them, he finds Hal already there. Hal informs him they will begin training soon, but candidly warns he will only get his ring when he is dead.

== Production ==
=== Development ===
The episode was written by co-executive producer Vanessa Baden Kelly, and directed by Stephen Williams. It marked Kelly's second writing credit, and Williams' first directing credit.

=== Writing ===
Vanessa Baden Kelly said that John Stewart's family was inspired by the real-life families of Black athletes, such as Tiger Woods, the Williams sisters and Jalen Brunson, explaining "They're having to make the really hard decision that I think a lot of Black people have to make, a lot of Black athletes have to make, a lot of Black creatives have to make, which is, if I keep trying to play the game the way that they want me to play it, they will always have an opportunity to pull the rug out from under me, so I'm just going to have to sacrifice what others may think, what we may think, if we're really trying to hit exceptionalism. It's a hard thing for Black creators. It's definitely been a hard thing for me".

Commenting on the narrative’s decision to give Bernadette agency in raising John, Jasmine Cephas Jones commented, "I just thought it was a really beautiful and like badass take on starting John's training and that it's her idea and she's really, really heavy on it. It's really cool to see women in this way and kind of like drive the force. I think sometimes we see a lot of women take the back seat in TV or films, and here we see her take the front seat and she puts her foot on the gas pretty, pretty hard". She further added, "The importance of having no fear in a society, and also being a person of color in this country, fear is instilled in our ancestry as well. That was also an important piece to talk about. How do we extract that for him to become the Green Lantern?"

Aaron Pierre said that John has "an immense amount of trauma that is unresolved and internalized." He also explained that John has not gone after his parents for his actions, as "John's exterior is very calm, it's very clean, it's very accurate, it's refined, but there has never been a moment internally for John as far as I'm concerned... where he hasn't felt so, so many volatile emotions just flying around. He's just gotten very good at mastering them enough to get the job done at the most elite level". Pierre said that the scene where Bernadette lies to John about the Guardians feeling unsastified with his lack of progress "breaks my heart", also stating, "he feels betrayed by the birds. How could they lie and say that I am not giving everything that I possibly can? I'm having guns aimed at me routinely. An inch south and I'm out of here, I'm out of here! Like how can they say I'm not pouring myself into this?"

== Reception ==
=== Viewers ===
In its original American broadcast, "OutKast" was seen by an estimated 0.69 million household viewers with a 0.18 in the 18–49 demographics. This means that 0.12 percent of all households with televisions watched the episode. This was a 23% increase in viewership from the previous episode, which was watched by an estimated 0.56 million household viewers with a 0.12 in the 18–49 demographics.

=== Critical reviews ===
"OutKast" received mostly positive reviews from critics. Jesse Schedeen of IGN gave the episode an "amazing" 9 out of 10 and wrote in his verdict, "Anyone bored with the typical tropes when it comes to superhero origin stories definitely needs to give Lanterns Episode 3 a watch. This installment succeeds in crafting a very different and extremely compelling take on John Stewart's formative years, revealing how two deeply committed but downright abusive parents shaped him into the fearless soldier he is in 2016. With a cleverly structured narrative and great performances all around, this episode is easily the strongest chapter of Lanterns so far."

Dennis Perkins of The A.V. Club gave the episode a "B+" grade and wrote, "Lanterns attempts to walk a tightrope between Watchmen-style (both versions) superhero deconstruction and its necessary inclusion in James Gunn's more colorful and hopeful reinvention of the DCU. And “OutKast,” Lanterns third episode, leaps purposefully off into the series' prestige drama side, showing just how one Black family's encounter with the superhuman nearly destroyed them all."

Siddhant Adlakha of Vulture gave the episode a 4 star rating out of 5 and wrote, "The resultant story makes for fascinating drama, akin to the highlight of HBO's Watchmen: its eighth episode, “A God Walks into Abar.” Although not quite as polished on the racial politics front, Lanterns's third episode is no less intriguing, as an hour of television dedicated not only to answering pressing questions but fleshing out its lead character in disturbing ways." Joe George of Den of Geek gave the episode a 4.5 star rating out of 5 and wrote, "“OutKast” finally lets Aaron Pierre cut loose, no longer forcing him to keep Stewart's emotions in check. The result is a complex piece of television that sees Lanterns embracing its sci-fi concepts and using them for rich, humane storytelling."

Michael John Petty of Collider gave the episode a 6 out of 10 rating and wrote, "The previous episode almost overemphasized John's importance, and this week is entirely devoted to the same. Yes, the past is prologue, but how much of that past is necessary for Lanterns to include? Perhaps that depends on the viewer." Eric Francisco of Esquire wrote, "What Lanterns episode 3 sacrifices in progressing the Rushville plot, it makes up for in character study. It is a tremendous hour of television, especially given its premise as a detour into backstory that places John in stark focus while grappling with the gray areas of abusive homes."

Noel Murray of The New York Times wrote, "But while that is the major plot point of this episode, the story isn't really about that. The credited screenwriter, Vanessa Baden Kelly, and the Lanterns creative team use this hour to snap together a mosaic of John Stewart, one tile at a time. Some of the pieces depict his highly unconventional childhood. Some follow him through one particularly gnarly Marines mission. Some cover his post-military detour through art school, when he might have been at his happiest." Denis Kimathi of TV Fanatic gave the episode a 4-star rating out of 5 and wrote, "“OutKast” speed-runs decades of a character's backstory to try to build an interesting character. It succeeds, but it also risks becoming a convoluted story that is hard to keep track of."
