= Florian Hoffmeister =

German cinematographer and director (b. 1970)

- Born: 1970 (age 55–56); Braunschweig, West Germany
- Education: German Film and Television Academy Berlin
- Occupations: Cinematographer, director
- Years active: 1996–present
- Spouse: Mona Kino
- Website: http://florianhoffmeister.de/

Florian Hoffmeister, B.S.C. (born 1970), is a German cinematographer and director, best known for his Oscar-nominated work on Todd Field's Tár.

== Career ==
Hoffmeister graduated from high school in 1989 and got his first job as an intern electrician on a film production. He studied directing and cinematography at Berlin's German Film and Television Academy. His first film, Three Degrees Colder won him a Silver Leopard for Best First Feature Film at the Locarno International Film Festival. A major breakthrough would come in 2011 when he served as the primary cinematographer on the British television mini-series Great Expectations, winning him an Emmy, a BAFTA, and the ASC award. He was listed by Variety in its "10 Cinematographers to Watch" list.

In 2016, he directed The Have-Nots, a film based on the novel by Katharina Hacker. The film is in black and white, which Hoffmeister explained as a strategy to "change how the audience in the theatres would view reality and whether the film would strike an emotional impact on them".

== Filmography ==
=== Director ===
Short film

- Stimmen der Welt (1998)

Feature film

- Three Degrees Colder (2005) (Also writer)
- The Have-Nots (2016) (Also co-producer)

=== Cinematographer ===
==== Feature film ====
Year	Title	Director	Notes
2000	Paul Is Dead	Hendrik Handloegten	
2001	Berlin Is in Germany	Hannes Stöhr	
2002	Kismet - Würfel Dein Leben!	Lars Kraume	
2003	Learning to Lie	Hendrik Handloegten	
2005	One Day in Europe	Hannes Stöhr	
2011	The Deep Blue Sea	Terence Davies	
2013	In Secret	Charlie Stratton	
2015	Mortdecai	David Koepp	
2016	A Quiet Passion	Terence Davies	
2018	Johnny English Strikes Again	David Kerr	
2019	Official Secrets	Gavin Hood	
2020	Divine	Jan Schomburg	
2021	Antlers	Scott Cooper	
2022	Tár	Todd Field	
2025	The Roses	Jay Roach	
TBA	The Riders †	Edward Berger	Filming

==== Television ====
Year	Title	Director	Notes
2003	Polizeiruf 110	Buddy Giovinazzo	Episode "Tiefe Wunden"
2003	Mutterkind	Alfa Conradt	TV short
2003	Tatort	Buddy Giovinazzo	Episode "3 x schwarzer Kater"
2007	Five Days	Otto Bathurst; Simon Curtis	Series One
2007	Post Mortem	Elmar Fischer	Episode "Notwehr"
2009	10 Minute Tales	Tony Grisoni	Episode "Syncing"
2011	Silk	Peter Moffat	Episodes "The Bitter End" and "High and Dry"
2012	Playhouse Presents	Jim Cartwright	Episode "King of the Teds"
2014	Hysteria	Otto Bathurst	Pilot
2018	The Terror	Edward Berger	Episodes "Go for Broke", "Gore" and "Punished, as a Boy"
2022	Pachinko	Kogonada	4 episodes
2024	True Detective	Issa López	Season 4 ("Night Country")
2026	Lanterns	James Hawes	Episodes "Pilot" and "Trust Fall"

Miniseries

Year	Title	Director
2008	House of Saddam	Alex Holmes; Jim O'Hanlon
2009	The Prisoner	Nick Hurran
2011	Great Expectations	Brian Kirk

== Awards and nominations ==
Year	Award	Category	Title	Result	Ref.
2022	Academy Awards	Best Cinematography	Tár	Nominated	
2011	American Society of Cinematographers	Outstanding Achievement in Cinematography in Made for Television	Great Expectations	Won	
2018	American Society of Cinematographers	Outstanding Achievement in Cinematography in Made for Television	The Terror (For episode "Go for Broke")	Nominated	
2022	Independent Spirit Awards	Best Cinematography	Tár	Won	
2009	Primetime Emmy Awards	Outstanding Cinematography for a Limited or Anthology Series or Movie	The Prisoner (For episode "Checkmate")	Nominated	
2011	Primetime Emmy Awards	Outstanding Cinematography for a Limited or Anthology Series or Movie	Great Expectations (For episode "Part 2")	Won	
