= Lanterns (TV series) =

2026 DC Studios television series

- Genre: Buddy cop; Detective; Drama; Neo-Western; Science fiction; Superhero
- Created by: Chris Mundy; Damon Lindelof; Tom King
- Based on: Characters from DC
- Showrunner: Chris Mundy
- Starring: Kyle Chandler; Aaron Pierre; Kelly Macdonald; Garret Dillahunt; Poorna Jagannathan; Ulrich Thomsen
- Music by: Stephanie Economou
- Country of origin: United States
- Original language: English
- No. of seasons: 1
- No. of episodes: 8

Production
- Executive producers: Chris Mundy; Damon Lindelof; James Gunn; Peter Safran; Tom King; James Hawes; Ron Schmidt
- Producer: Kiegan Downs
- Production location: Los Angeles
- Cinematography: Florian Hoffmeister; Gregory Middleton; Armando Salas
- Editors: Vikash Patel; Robert Abilez; Emily E. Greene; Matthew V. Colonna
- Running time: 47–57 minutes
- Production companies: Man, Woman & Child Productions; DC Studios; Warner Bros. Television

Original release
- Network: HBO
- Release: August 16, 2026 – present

Related
- DCU TV series

Lanterns is an American superhero television series created by Chris Mundy, Damon Lindelof, and Tom King for HBO, based on the DC Comics Green Lantern characters Hal Jordan and John Stewart. It is the third television series in the DC Universe (DCU). It features experienced Lantern Hal Jordan and new recruit John Stewart as they team up with local sheriff Kerry Kane to investigate murders in Rushville, Nebraska that leads to a wider mystery. The series was produced by DC Studios and Warner Bros. Television with Mundy serving as showrunner.

Kyle Chandler, Aaron Pierre and Kelly Macdonald respectively star as Jordan, Stewart and Kane. Garret Dillahunt, Poorna Jagannathan and Ulrich Thomsen also star. Greg Berlanti began developing a Green Lantern television series by October 2019. After James Gunn and Peter Safran became co-CEOs of DC Studios in October 2022, the series was redeveloped. It was announced in January 2023, along with its detective story style, which was inspired by the series True Detective (2014–present) and Slow Horses (2022–present). The involvement of Mundy, Lindelof, and King was confirmed in mid-2024 when HBO ordered the series. Slow Horses's James Hawes was hired to direct the first two episodes in October, when Chandler and Pierre were cast. Filming took place in Los Angeles from February to July 2025, with Stephen Williams, Geeta Vasant Patel, and Alik Sakharov also directing.

Lanterns premiered on August 16, 2026, and ran for eight episodes through October 4. It is part of the DCU's Chapter One: Gods and Monsters. The series received positive reviews and had strong viewership.

== Premise ==
Green Lanterns are interstellar peacekeepers who wear rings that give them extraordinary powers. The series follows experienced Lantern Hal Jordan and new recruit John Stewart as they investigate a murder in Rushville, Nebraska, which Hal believes is an extraterrestrial incident and leads them to darker mysteries and reckonings.

== Cast and characters ==
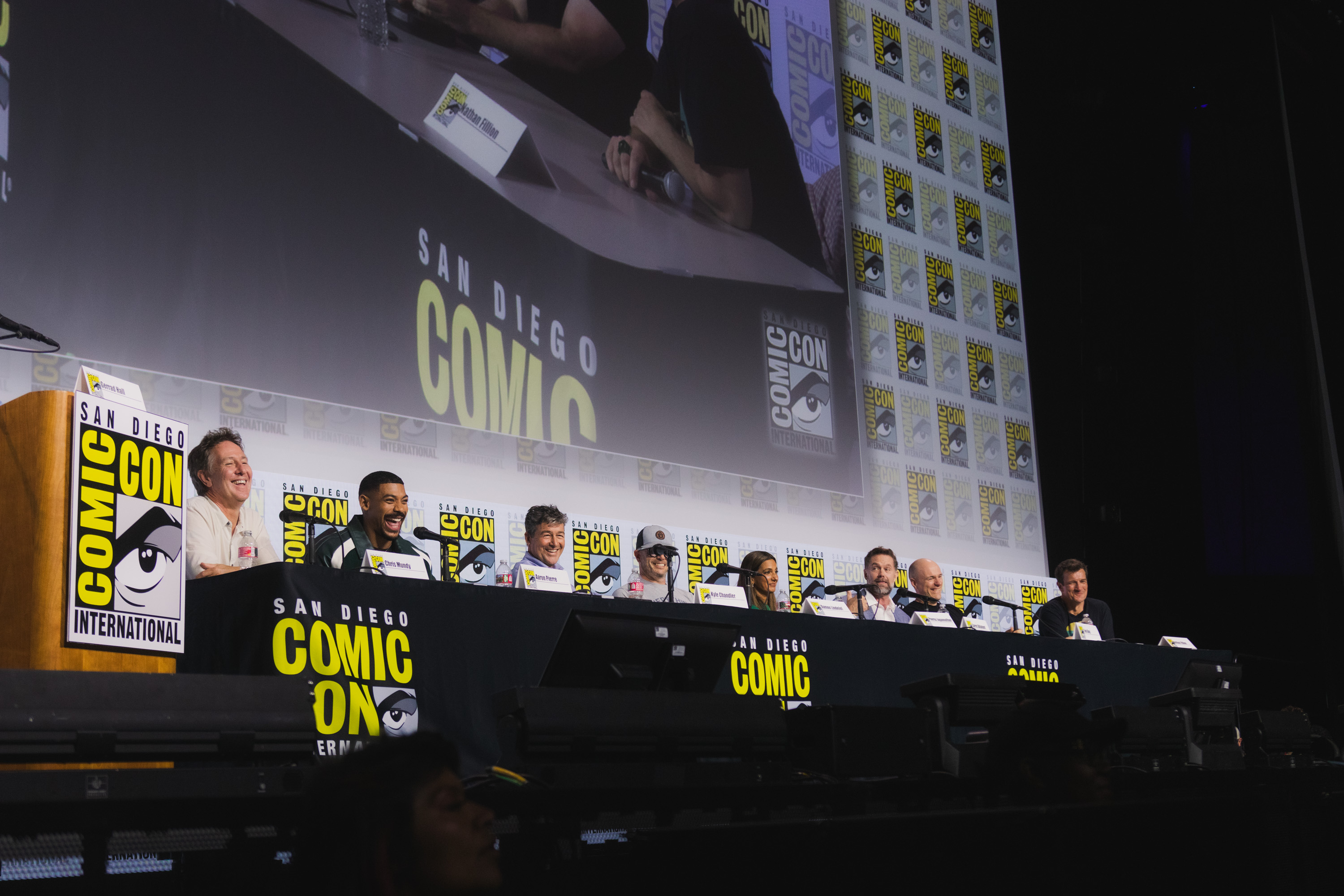
Showrunner Chris Mundy, stars Aaron Pierre and Kyle Chandler, co-creator Damon Lindelof, co-stars Poorna Jagannathan and Garret Dillahunt, co-creator Tom King, and guest star Nathan Fillion promoting Lanterns at the 2026 San Diego Comic-Con

=== Main ===
- Kyle Chandler as Hal Jordan / Green Lantern:
  A USAF veteran, former test pilot, and legendary member of the Green Lantern Corps, who is responsible for protecting Sector 2814. In the series, Hal is approaching retirement, and is filling in to train John Stewart. The Guardians of the Universe, who founded and lead the Corps, are concerned about what Hal may or may not have inherited from his former mentor Thaal Sinestro. The writers took inspiration for the character from Sam Shepard's portrayal of Chuck Yeager in the film The Right Stuff (1983). Showrunner Chris Mundy felt Chandler had the same qualities as well as a "dry wit" they felt was important for Hal. Henry Samiri portrays a young Hal in flashback scenes.
- Aaron Pierre as John Stewart:
  A new Green Lantern recruit whom Hal is training to replace himself. John is considered an anomaly because he is the first Green Lantern in the Corps' history to have been recruited by the Guardians of the Universe instead of being chosen by a power ring, as is customary. Mundy said the character was both a Marine and an artistic architect, and felt Pierre could portray both of these aspects. He said Pierre was a "serious theater actor, yet he also looks like he was built in a lab to be an action star". Director James Hawes said Pierre had "a magnificent presence. He feels so forceful, so cool, so understated." Jayce Eiland and Cairo Cash Lee portray John as a child and a teenager, respectively, in flashback scenes.
- Kelly Macdonald as Kerry Kane: The sheriff of Rushville, Nebraska, who originally hailed from Gotham City. Kerry is deeply devoted to her family and close-knit town, while also territorial around Hal and John upon their arrival at Rushville. Kerry is a love interest for Hal in the series.
- Garret Dillahunt as William "Will" Macon: Kerry's father-in-law and a powerful rancher whose avowed aim is to protect his community from alien threats
- Poorna Jagannathan as Zoe Macon: A Manhunter posing as William's human wife who seduces John to gain his trust
- Ulrich Thomsen as Thaal Sinestro: A "ruthless yet undeniably charming" former Green Lantern, and Hal's mentor and father figure, who went rogue and was expelled from the Green Lantern Corps after a failed coup, during which he killed one of the twelve Guardians of the Universe. Sinestro appears imprisoned in space as of 2016, though he had escaped by 2026.

=== Recurring ===
- Jason Ritter as Billy Macon: Kerry's lawyer husband and William's son who does his father's bidding. Several years following the events of 2016, Billy and Kerry have divorced.
- J. Alphonse Nicholson as John Stewart Sr.: John's father who is in the military
- Cary Christopher and Shea Pritchard as Noah Macon: Kerry and Billy's son and William's grandson who is later revealed to be a Manhunter. Christopher portrays Noah as a child in 2016 while Pritchard portrays Noah as a teenager in 2026.
- Michael Ocampo as Lopez: A deputy with the Rushville police
- Paul Ben-Victor as Antaan: An extraterrestrial leader who seeks revenge for the genocide of his species and possesses the ability to detonate his body
- Laura Linney as Lianna: A member of the Guardians of the Universe who selects John as a potential Lantern recruit
- Jasmine Cephas Jones as Bernadette Stewart: John's mother
- Jared Grimes as Marcus Stewart: John's older brother. Noah Gibson-Slates and Richard Whitney Gardenhire Jr. portray Marcus respectively as a child and teenager.
- Romeo Brown as Aaron Stewart: John's older brother. Lumi Oniyide and Jaylen Lyndon Hunter portray Aaron respectively as a child and teenager.
- Hannah Christine Shetler as Maggie: A waitress who works at a café in Rushville

=== Guest ===
- Chris Coy as "Waylon Sanders": An alien and a member of Antaan's species who disguises himself as a nervous truck driver
- Sergio Lanza as a Green Lantern recruiter who approaches John in 2016
- Jason Manuel Olazabal as Hector Gutiérrez: An engineer forced by William to pose as Hector Hammond, owner of Atlas Inc., who operates various high-tech slaughterhouses
- Nathan Fillion as Guy Gardner / Green Lantern: A former physical education teacher and abrasive Green Lantern who is a member of the Justice Gang. Fillion described the character as "a little bit higher strung" in Lanterns compared to his introduction in the DC Universe (DCU) film Superman (2025), and that he enjoyed exploring the character in a new environment.
- Amie MacKenzie as Carol Ferris: Hal's former love interest
- Jake B. Miller as Martin Jordan: Hal's deceased father
- Matt Rhule as a fictional version of himself who is the head coach of the Nebraska Cornhuskers football team

== Episodes ==
No.	Title	Directed by	Written by	Original release date	U.S. viewers (millions)
1	"Pilot"	James Hawes	Chris Mundy & Damon Lindelof & Tom King	August 16, 2026	0.63
Years ago, Hal Jordan is chosen to succeed Green Lantern Abin Sur after his death. In 2016, Hal trains John Stewart as the next Green Lantern. After John receives a cryptic message from a hologram of Hal's younger consciousness within his power ring, they travel to Rushville, Nebraska, where John helps Sheriff Kerry Kane capture a suspect in a mass shooting at a high school football game. Hal suspects that the victims and detainee are disguised aliens, but Kerry excludes him from the investigation. After Hal is arrested following a bar fight, Kerry's husband, lawyer Billy Macon, bails him out and introduces him to his father Will, a powerful rancher. John discovers that Will's wife Zoe is his recent one-night stand. Will arranges for Hal to interrogate the suspect, Waylon Sanders, whom Hal exposes as an alien. Waylon triggers an explosion, exhausting Hal's ring while he contains it. In 2026, John returns to Rushville, where Kerry shows him Hal's dead body.
2	"Trust Fall"	James Hawes	Vanessa Baden Kelly & Chris Mundy	August 23, 2026	0.56
In 2016, with his ring nearly depleted, Hal sends John back to Coast City to retrieve the lantern used to recharge it while he continues investigating the shooting. After learning that the stadium's metal detectors are actually alien detectors, Hal convinces Kerry to let him question Will. Will refuses to cooperate and has Hal shot when he refuses to leave the estate. Hal later wakes in a hospital, where he and Kerry reach an understanding. After retrieving Hal's lantern and Green Lantern suit, John is kidnapped by aliens associated with Waylon. Their leader, Antaan, reveals that they came to Rushville searching for a Manhunter, an artificial being responsible for the genocide of their race. The aliens threaten to destroy Rushville unless John finds the undercover Manhunter within 48 hours. John informs Hal, who travels to an off-world prison to question Thaal Sinestro, his former mentor and a rogue Green Lantern, about the Manhunters, but Sinestro instead asks about John.
3	"OutKast"	Stephen Williams	Vanessa Baden Kelly	August 30, 2026	0.69
In the past, John's father, John Sr., fails a test to become a Green Lantern, leaving him traumatized. Later, Lianna, a member of the Guardians of the Universe, offers John's family recompense by giving him a chance to join the Green Lantern Corps in the future. From his fifth birthday, John's parents train him through increasingly extreme tests to prepare him to become a Green Lantern. Years later, John joins the United States Marine Corps and is assigned an assassination mission, but Hal's intervention causes him to be dishonorably discharged. John's mother Bernadette then enrolls him in art school so he can pursue his passion for architecture. In 2016, John is approached by a recruiter working for the Guardians and successfully passes his test. Lianna accepts him as the new Green Lantern, but only under Hal's guidance as his apprentice. John returns home, where Hal has told his parents the news, but privately tells John that he does not need a sidekick or intend to give him his ring.
4	"The Weenie"	Geeta Vasant Patel	Breannah Gibson	September 6, 2026	0.39
In 2016, Sinestro gives Hal information about the Manhunters and suggests delivering the one in Rushville to the Guardians to prove John is unfit to replace him. Lianna urges John to take Hal's ring and replace him. Suspecting Will's benefactor is at his ranch, Hal and John infiltrate the property, where they discover an armory of high-tech weapons before being captured. Will admits he is protecting his benefactor's identity in exchange for keeping Rushville safe, revealing that the benefactor cured his terminal illness. Zoe secretly meets John and later warns him to leave town, but he refuses. As Zoe leaves, her truck is destroyed by an orbital strike, apparently killing her. Kerry helps Hal and John trace the attack to Atlas, Inc. owner Hector Hammond, who claims to be a decoy and identifies Will as the Manhunter. Hal instead deduces that Zoe is the Manhunter and accuses John of hiding this from him. After John calls Antaan to arrange a meeting, Hal jumps from their car, causing it to crash with John inside.
5	"Lights Out"	Geeta Vasant Patel	Justin Britt-Gibson	September 13, 2026	0.46
Hal leaves John trapped in a burning car, severely injuring him, but Zoe heals him with alien technology. She reveals that she is the Manhunter who killed Abin Sur after arriving on Earth, explaining that the Guardians created the Manhunters as peacekeepers before destroying them when they went rogue, leaving her as the sole survivor. Kerry urges Hal to leave before Zoe destroys Rushville, but he refuses. Hal sends Antaan after Will, and Antaan kills him after discovering he is not the Manhunter. Zoe then orders orbital strikes that destroy Rushville. Hal attempts to stop her and Antaan, who detonates himself. At a motel, John ambushes Hal while he recharges his ring, intending to take it. Zoe destroys the motel, trapping Hal beneath the debris, but John fatally shoots her when she arrives to kill him. John takes Zoe's artificial heart and Hal's ring, leaving Hal behind. John then gives both the heart and the ring to Lianna at a bar while declining her offer to become the Green Lantern.
6	"Bad Optics"	Stephen Williams	Justin Britt-Gibson & Damon Lindelof	September 20, 2026	0.55
In 2026, John works as an architect with his brother Marcus. Bernadette calls John and informs him that Hal, who returned to Rushville to atone for the 2016 incident, wants to apologize. John meets Hal at a café, but they fail to reconcile, and John breaks his nose. Afterwards, Kerry contacts John to tell him Hal's death, and reveals that she and Hal began a romantic relationship. They find a key leading to Hal's storage locker, where a vault requires Hal's live voice print. John uses a beacon to summon current Green Lantern Guy Gardner to Rushville, provoking hostility from Billy and other townspeople. A fight breaks out, leading to John's arrest. Guy later visits John, who asks him to retrieve Hal's suit and ring for the funeral. Guy reveals that Sinestro has escaped prison. Maggie, a café waitress, threatens to tell Kerry that John broke Hal's nose unless he compensates her family for damage he caused in 2016. After Hal's funeral, John exhumes his body, takes his ring, and summons Hal's hologram.
7	"The Jordan Boys' Legacy"	Alik Sakharov	Damon Lindelof & Tom King	September 27, 2026	0.63
In 1975, young Hal receives from his father Martin a key to his safe, asking him to preserve their family legacy. Martin later dies in a plane crash. In 2026, John tells Hal's hologram that Hal was murdered and asks for help investigating. The hologram agrees to open Hal's vault after meeting Kerry, but privately suspects her of killing Hal. Inside, they find supplies and a portable wormhole leading to Antaan's devastated homeworld, where they discover that the Manhunters used a fear-inducing gas that drove his species to kill each other. While crossing a lake, John hallucinates his father and younger self and unknowingly points his gun at himself before the hologram saves him. The hologram reveals that Hal's father and grandfather died by suicide due to a family history of depression, explaining the family legacy, and John suspects Hal did the same. At a refinery-like complex on the island, they are attacked by a hooded figure whom John subdues and unmasks as Sinestro.
8	"Dirt and Stars"	Alik Sakharov	Chris Mundy & Damon Lindelof & Tom King	October 4, 2026	0.65
Shortly before dying, Hal decides to stay in Rushville; one night, his house is set on fire with him inside. Hal later awakens in a slaughterhouse, where Kerry’s son Noah reveals that he saved him using alien technology, and that Noah himself is a Manhunter. At the complex, John learns from Sinestro that Noah freed and brought him to the island to forge a lantern from its water, charged with both will and fear energy. John then returns to Earth, where Noah ambushes him, seeking revenge for Zoe's death after discovering his nature as a Manhunter. After a heart-to-heart, fearing his Manhunter side, Noah asks John to kill him after the game. During the game, John tells Kerry he knows she killed Hal to protect Noah and tells her Noah's request, but says he won't kill him and would instead stop him if he ever succumbs to his Manhunter nature. John then summons Guy and tells him that he will be taking over as Earth's protector. John charges the ring while reciting his own oath, gives Maggie her compensation, and reunites with his family.

== Production ==
=== Background ===
Greg Berlanti, the producer of multiple DC Comics–based television series, announced that he was developing a series based on the Green Lantern characters for the streaming service HBO Max in October 2019. Berlanti had previously co-written the film Green Lantern (2011). In January 2020, he said the series would span several decades and tell two stories about Green Lanterns on Earth, as well as a story about the villainous character Sinestro in space. The series was officially picked up for a 10-episode season by HBO Max that October. Marc Guggenheim, who also co-wrote the Green Lantern film, and Seth Grahame-Smith were revealed to be writing the series, with Grahame-Smith serving as showrunner. The series could not make use of the main Green Lanterns from the comic books, Hal Jordan and John Stewart, because they were being reserved for DC Extended Universe (DCEU) films. Instead, the series was set to explore other Green Lanterns from the comics, including Guy Gardner, Jessica Cruz, Simon Baz, Alan Scott, Kilowog, and new Green Lanterns created for the series.

In April 2021, the series was revealed to primarily focus on Scott, a secretly gay FBI agent in 1941 who becomes Earth's first Green Lantern, and Gardner, an "embodiment of 1980s hyper-patriotism", alongside the half-alien Bree Jarta in 1984. Finn Wittrock was cast as Gardner after Berlanti received permission from producer Ryan Murphy for the actor to prioritize Green Lantern over the planned second season of Murphy's Netflix series Ratched (2020). An actor was in negotiations to portray Scott. The series was said to be the most expensive in Berlanti's career and was expected to begin filming later in 2021. Berlanti had been writing with Grahame-Smith and Guggenheim, who were all serving as executive producers alongside Geoff Johns, Sarah Schechter, David Madden, and David Katzenberg. Pornsak Pichetshote, who previously served as an editor for DC's Vertigo Comics imprint and was an executive at DC Entertainment overseeing its television content, was later revealed to be part of the writers' room as well. Jeremy Irvine was revealed to be in talks to portray Scott in May, and was officially cast soon after. Lee Toland Krieger was hired to direct the first two episodes at the end of the month. In August 2021, Wittrock said filming would begin at the end of the year or in early 2022.

In April 2022, Discovery, Inc. and Warner Bros.' parent company WarnerMedia merged to become Warner Bros. Discovery (WBD), led by president and CEO David Zaslav. The new company was expected to restructure DC Entertainment while Zaslav began searching for an equivalent to Marvel Studios president Kevin Feige to lead the new subsidiary. In June, Irvine said there was no scheduled start date for filming the series and the production was working on "getting all the stars to align". A month later, the series was reaffirmed to be in development despite the cancellation of other HBO Max and DC projects by WBD. In October 2022, Grahame-Smith was revealed to have left the series, which was being redeveloped to focus on Stewart. James Gunn and Peter Safran were announced as the co-chairs and co-CEOs of the newly formed DC Studios at the end of that month. A week after starting their new roles, the pair had begun developing an eight-to-ten-year plan for a new DC Universe (DCU) that would be a "soft reboot" of the DCEU.

=== Development ===
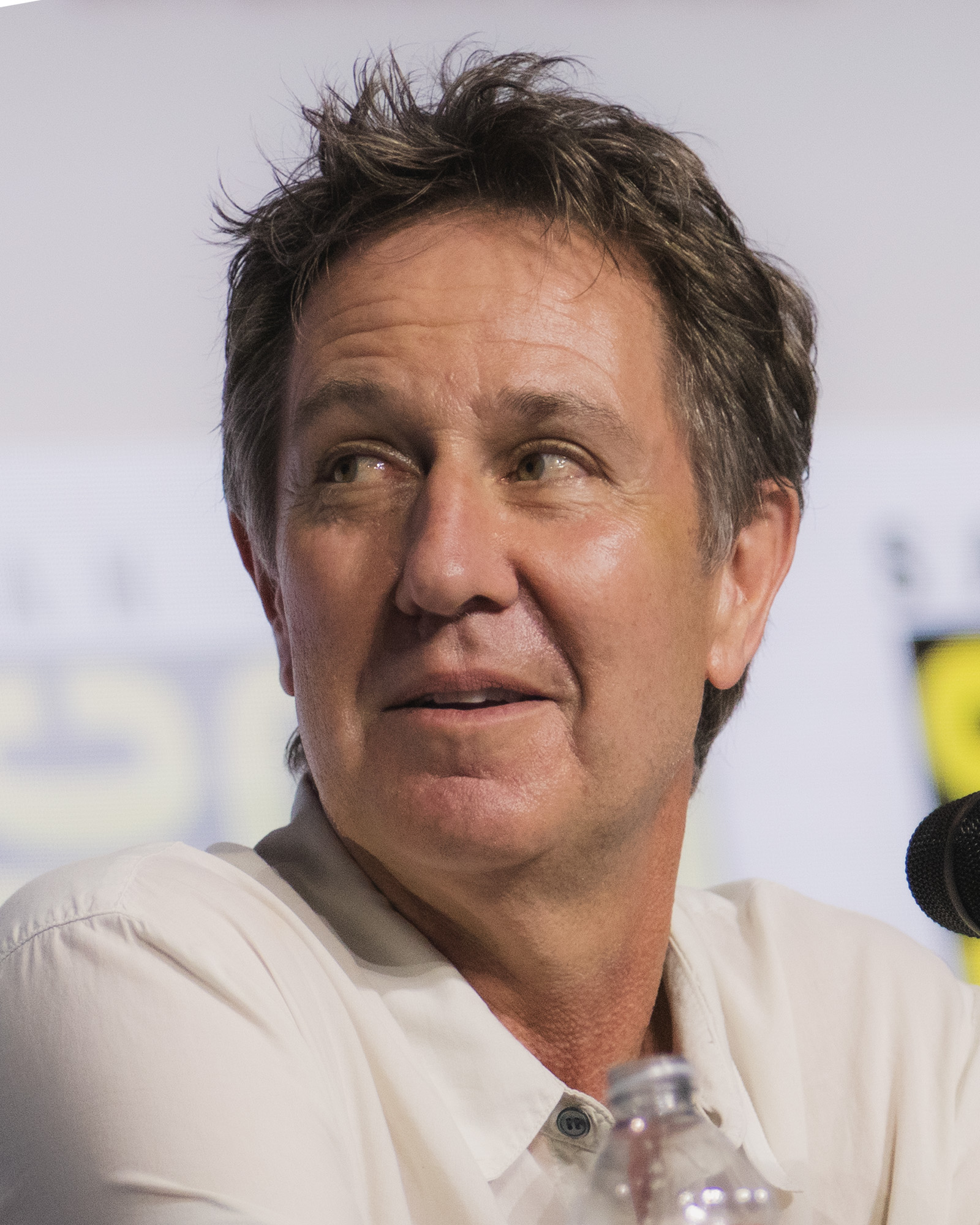
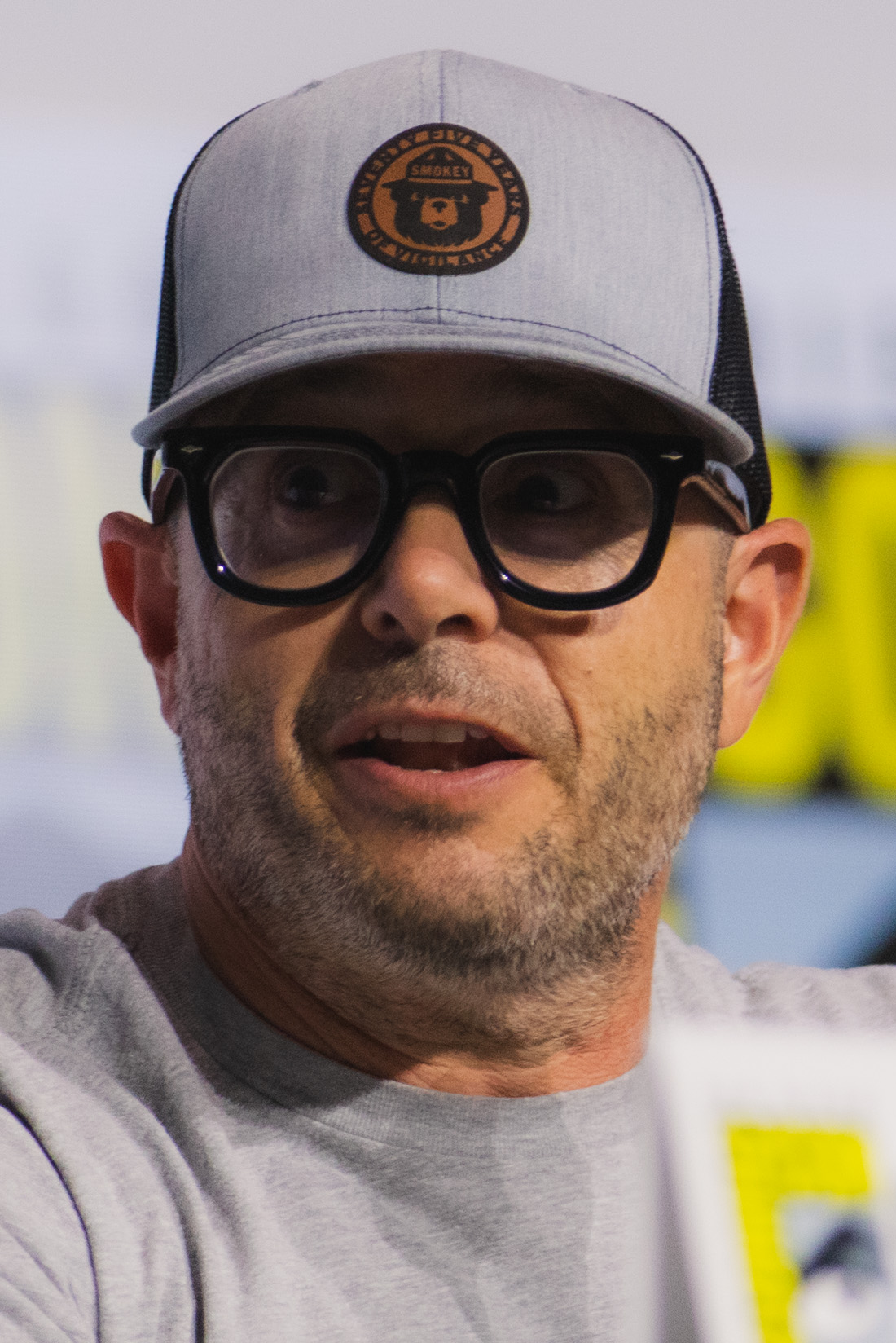
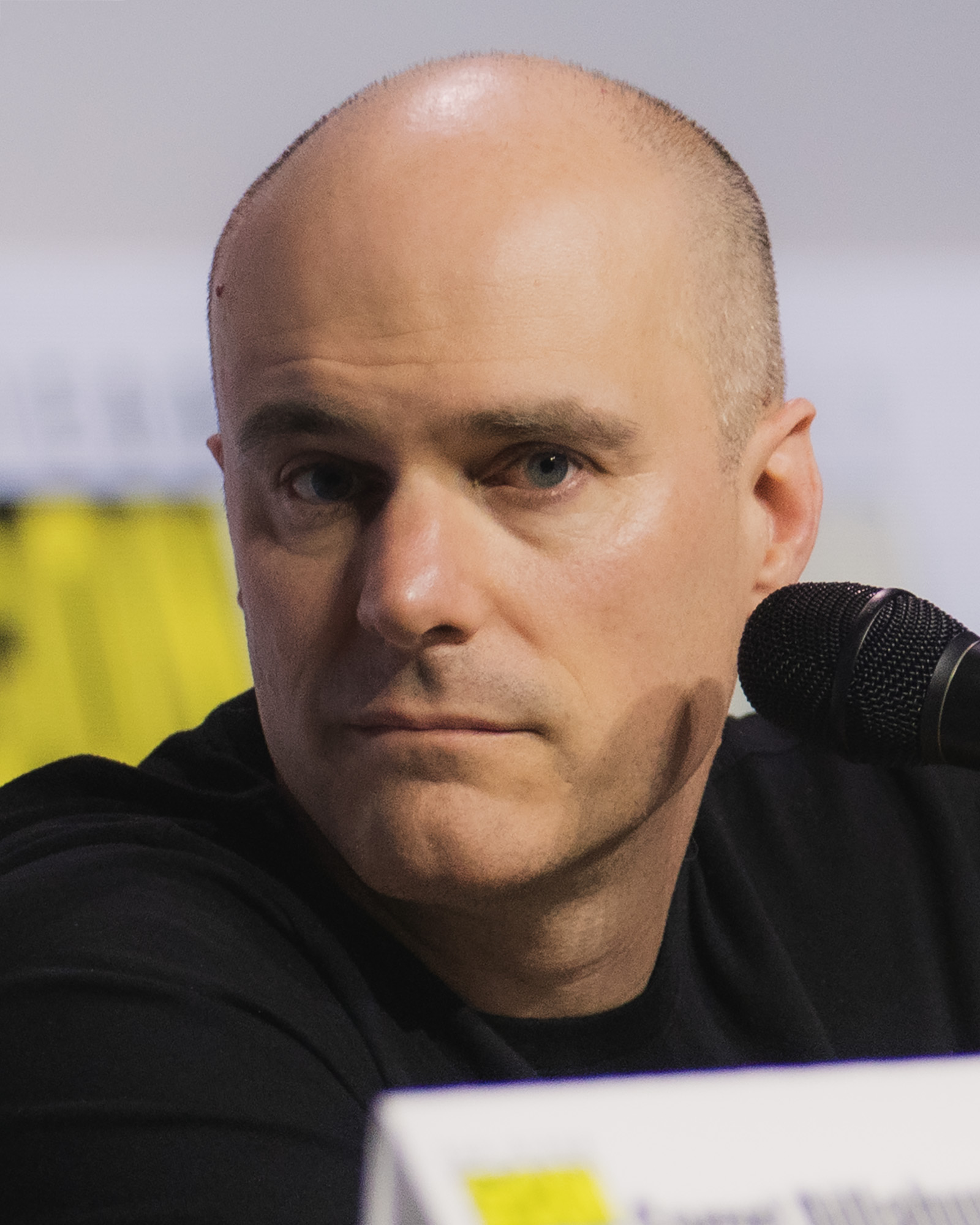
Showrunner Chris Mundy co-created Lanterns with Damon Lindelof and Tom King, who pitched the series' concept. The trio wrote its series bible and drew inspiration for the grounded buddy cop detective approach and tone from the crime drama True Detective and the spy thriller Slow Horses. Mundy and Lindelof were hired in part for their work within the crime and mystery genres.

Gunn said in December 2022 that Green Lantern characters would be an important part of the new DCU. On January 31, 2023, he and Safran unveiled the first projects from their DCU slate, which begins with Chapter One: Gods and Monsters. The third television series in the slate was Lanterns, a new iteration of the long-in-development Green Lantern series. This version features the two best-known Green Lanterns, Hal Jordan and John Stewart, and Safran said it would be an Earth-based detective story rather than the space opera that Berlanti had envisioned. He said the series would be an "HBO-quality event" in the style of crime drama series True Detective (2014–present), and spy thriller series Slow Horses (2022–present). In January 2023, Safran said the mystery that Jordan and Stewart investigate leads into the main storyline for the DCU, so the series was an important project for Gunn and Safran.

Damon Lindelof was consulting on the series as a producer by January 2024, when it was said to be a priority project for HBO Max (at that time briefly renamed to simply "Max"). The following month, Chris Mundy was reported to be serving as showrunner while Tom King, a member of the DC Studios writers' room, was also attached as a producer. Gunn confirmed the involvement of Mundy, King, and Lindelof in May 2024. King had originally pitched the concept for the series, and Mundy was hired by Gunn and Safran based on his work on the crime drama Ozark (2017–2022) as well as the fourth season of True Detective (2024). Mundy and King began developing the series together and enlisted Lindelof, who created the DC Comics–based limited series Watchmen (2019). Lindelof agreed to join because of his love for Ozark and King's comic books. Mundy, Lindelof, and King are credited as the series' creators.

The series received an eight-episode straight-to-series order from Max's corporate sibling channel HBO in June 2024, when Mundy was confirmed as showrunner and executive producer. The move to HBO was made after WBD decided to shift many of its planned big-budget Max series based on their own intellectual property to be HBO originals instead; Lanterns was expected to still stream on Max in addition to airing on HBO. Each episode was expected to have an approximately hour-long runtime. DC Studios was meeting with possible directors for the series' pilot by September, including Stephen Williams, who worked with Lindelof on Watchmen. James Hawes, who directed the first season of Slow Horses, was hired to direct the first two episodes of Lanterns and serve as an executive producer the next month. In February 2025, Williams was confirmed to be directing for the series, alongside Geeta Vasant Patel and Alik Sakharov, while Ron Schmidt joined as an executive producer the following month.

Also in February 2025, Safran stated that the series could continue beyond its first season. Mundy added that Lanterns would stand alone from other DC Studios projects and was designed to tell a complete story, but he hoped that it could expand to have multiple seasons. Lanterns was expected to be a multi-season series by May 2026, when television and comic book writer Christopher Cantwell was hired to work on a potential second season as a writer, executive producer, and co-showrunner alongside Mundy. Lindelof and King did not return as writers because of their commitments to the HBO series The Chain and the DCU animated series Mister Miracle, respectively, though King remained involved in some capacity. A writers' room had been working on the season for more than a month, around six weeks, by that August, but HBO was waiting to greenlight a second season until after the series premiered later that month to gauge its critical and audience reception and viewership ratings. On the potential demand for a second season, Mundy stated, "We feel good that we told the story in season one well. The question is whether [season two] is a story people are interested in. If that's the case, then we'll get to do another one. We'll tell it in a slightly different way, so that it feels fresh, with characters you know and care about." He added that they were "just in the breaking-story stages" and that they would discuss it with HBO and DC Studios executives "really soon" once they had mapped out a whole season. After Gunn and Safran were ousted from DC Studios and replaced with Jeremy Latcham in November 2026, Mundy admitted he had been surprised by the move, expecting that there would have not been no changes after the acquisition of Warner Bros. Discovery by Paramount Skydance, and now stating the chances of Lanterns getting renewed were "50/50". It was later claimed that the series was unlikely to be renewed for a second season.

=== Writing ===
Mundy, King, and Lindelof had written the pilot script and series bible for Lanterns by the end of May 2024, when they were assembling a full writers' room. Justin Britt-Gibson, Breannah Gibson, and Vanessa Baden Kelly are also writers on the series. They were present on set to answer questions regarding comic book history and instructed the actors to have a holistic understanding of Jordan and Stewart's characters rather than reading comics from a specific time period. King also took inspiration from his experience as a CIA counterterrorism officer. Britt-Gibson previously worked with Lindelof on the script for an untitled Star Wars film. Writing for the series was completed by the start of filming in February 2025.

Lanterns unfolds across two storylines: the first, set in 2016, involves a murder in Rushville, Nebraska, which Jordan believes to be an extraterrestrial incident; and the second, involving Jordan's own murder, takes place in 2026. Mundy likened the story's structure to the "emotional mysteries" in the first season of True Detective (2014), which he described as less of a traditional whodunit and more of an exploration of why the mystery takes place, bound by the relationship between Jordan and Stewart in Lanterns that Mundy compared to the characters Rust Cohle and Marty Hart from True Detective. The series primarily occurs in Sheridan County, Nebraska, with some scenes taking place in Iowa. It does not adapt any specific storylines from the comics, though Mundy said it is "steeped" in the Green Lantern comic book lore, as the main characters possess power rings, the primary weapons of the Green Lantern Corps and the source of their powers, while other aspects of the lore are either seen or referenced in the series. However, the series is more grounded than the comics. Mundy said he was excited to create "something really grounded inside this big, amazing mythology. From the beginning, all we talked about was, how can we take all the things we loved about the source material and turn it into a layered, human HBO drama?" He wanted the series to be accessible to audiences unfamiliar with the comics' history, yet satisfying to those who were. Mundy emphasized the series spanning across various timeframes and the presence of the buddy cop elements, noting that Jordan and Stewart would act as "opposing forces" in season one. Lindelof, Mundy and King decided early in development to kill Hal as a plot twist to provide greater emotional stakes and deepen his relationship with John. They initially considered Sheriff Kerry Kane as the victim but rejected the idea to avoid using the "fridging" trope. Hal's hologram references Hal's multiple deaths in the source material. The creators also changed Hal's origin story, revealing through the Halogram that his father, Martin, died by suicide rather than in an accident. This change allowed them to explore Hal's fear while creating their own interpretation of his origins.

Gunn was excited for the series to have a different tone from the first DCU film Superman (2025), despite that project also featuring a Green Lantern in Guy Gardner, whom Mundy described as "fabulously obnoxious" and said would appear at "a few different times" in the series; the events of Superman occur between the two time periods of the series. Gardner appears as part of the 2026 storyline, with references to the events of Superman. Mundy explained the creative team had full creative freedom over the story and were not required to make it adhere to any other DCU projects. He further elaborated that the story did not have any required "specific landing point," feeling particularly satisfied with Stewart's characterization. Gunn also teased that Lanterns would be "really important in setting up things" in the wider context of the DCU.

=== Casting ===
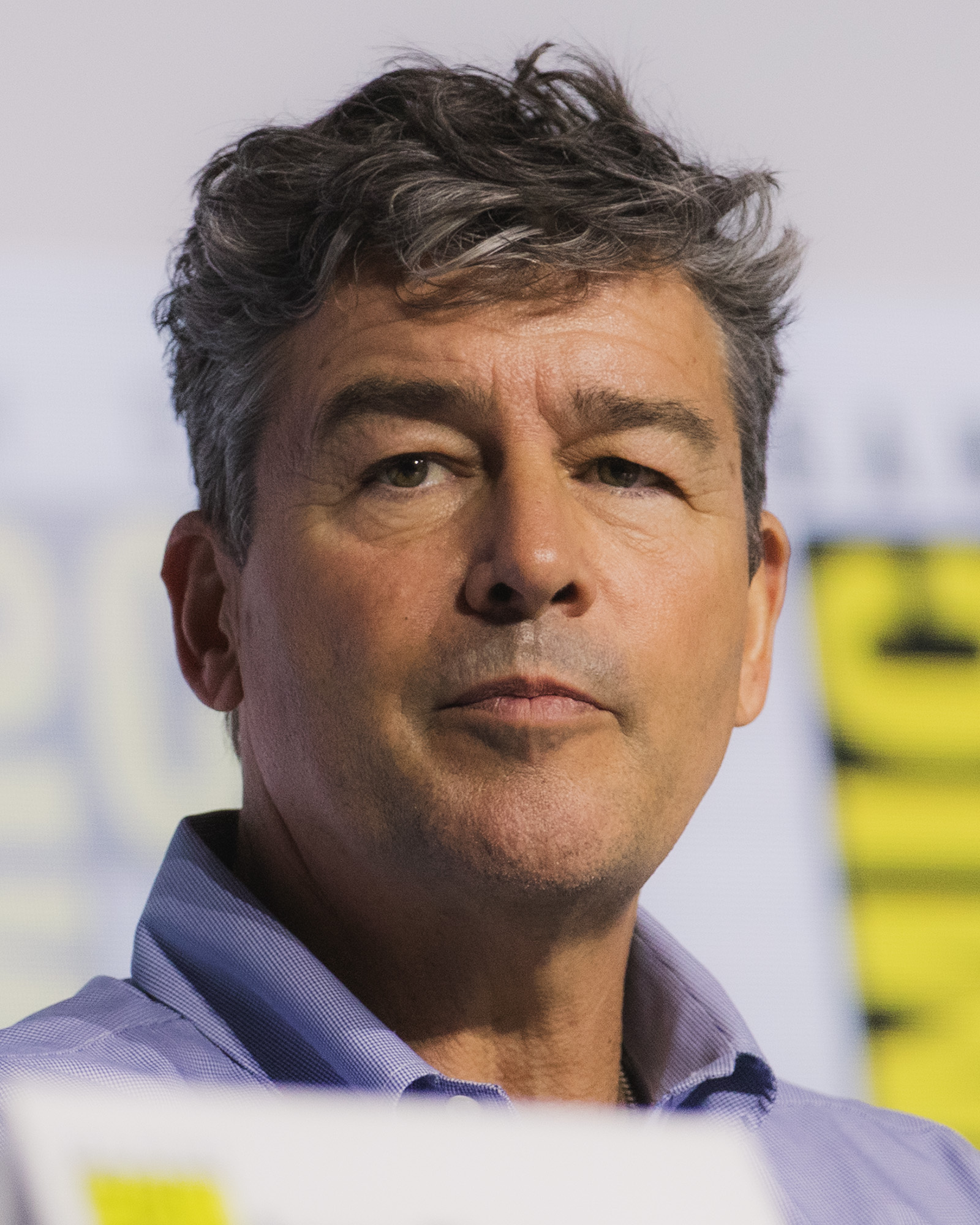
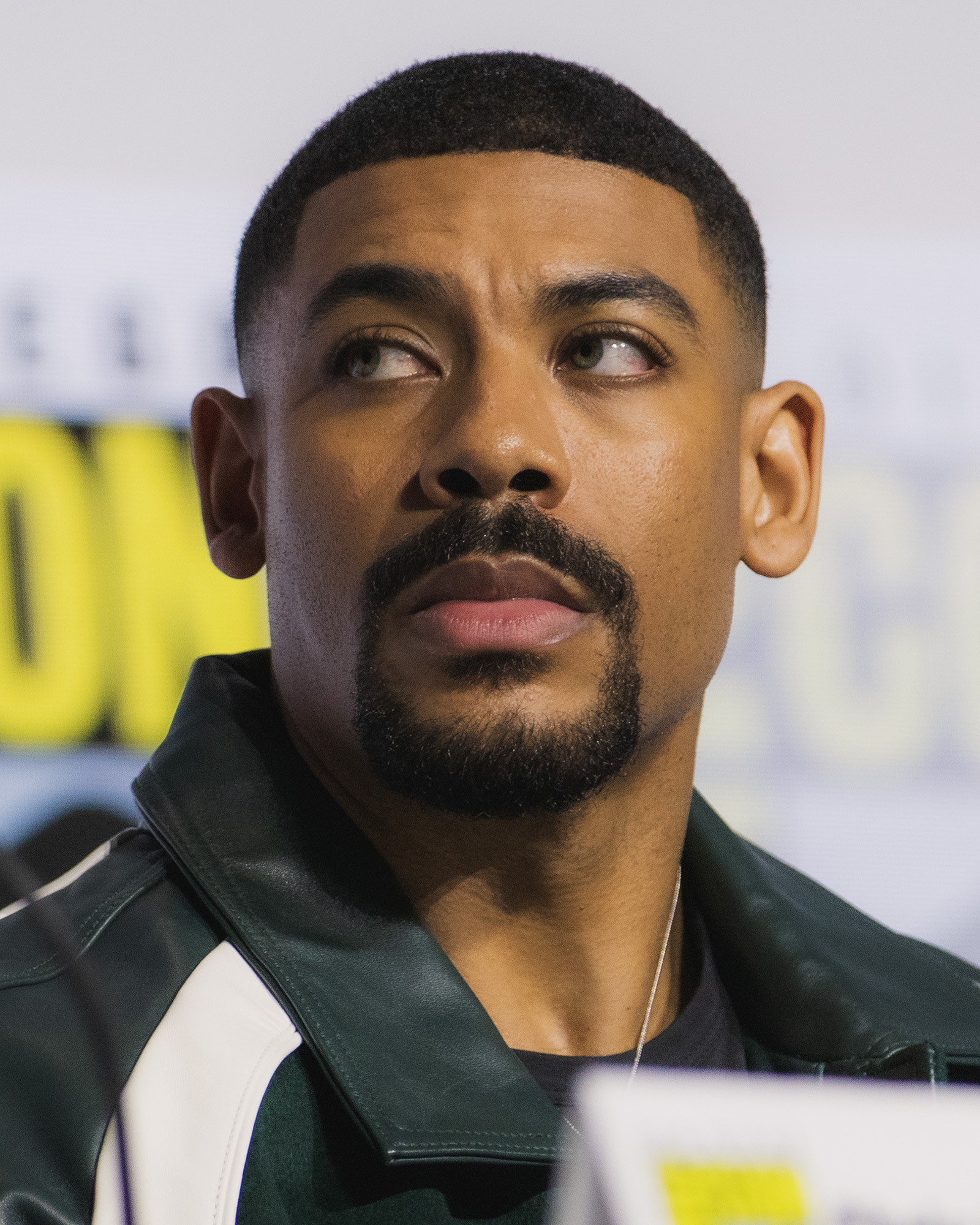
Kyle Chandler and Aaron Pierre headline Lanterns as the Green Lantern members Hal Jordan and John Stewart.

In December 2022, Gunn stated actor Ryan Reynolds would not reprise his role as Hal Jordan from the Green Lantern film. Nathan Fillion was cast as Guy Gardner for Superman in July 2023, and he was expected to co-star in the series by September 2024. At that time, Josh Brolin was revealed to have been offered the role of Jordan at the end of August. The actor was looking for a new television role following the cancellation of his series Outer Range (2022–2024) and had previously played the DC Comics character Jonah Hex in the 2010 film of the same name. Jordan was expected to be the gruff, older partner similar to Danny Glover's Roger Murtaugh in the Lethal Weapon films. DC Studios was looking to cast a younger, "fresh-faced" Black actor as John Stewart, who was expected to be in his 20s. Matthew McConaughey and Ewan McGregor were also in consideration for Jordan if a deal with Brolin could not be finalized. Brolin passed on the role soon after his potential involvement was reported, saying it "didn't work out", and McConaughey was also not expected to be cast.

Kyle Chandler was in negotiations to portray Jordan by the end of September, while Aaron Pierre and Stephan James were in the mix to portray Stewart. Gunn had almost cast Pierre as Adam Warlock in his Marvel Cinematic Universe (MCU) film Guardians of the Galaxy Vol. 3 (2023), and the actor previously portrayed Dev-Em in the DC Comics–based series Krypton (2018–2019). Damson Idris was also on the shortlist to portray Stewart before a scheduling conflict arose. Screen tests for Pierre and James were held in early October with Chandler. On October 9, Pierre was cast as Stewart and Chandler was confirmed to be cast as Jordan. Kelly Macdonald was cast in the main role of Sheriff Kerry at the end of the month. Garret Dillahunt and Poorna Jagannathan were cast in the major recurring roles of William Macon and Zoe, respectively, in November, and Ulrich Thomsen was cast in January 2025 to recur in the series as Thaal Sinestro. In March, Nicole Ari Parker, Jasmine Cephas Jones, Sherman Augustus, J. Alphonse Nicholson, and Jason Ritter were respectively cast in the recurring roles of Stewart's mother Bernadette, a younger version of Bernadette, Stewart's father John Sr., a younger version of John Sr., and Billy Macon, while Fillion was confirmed to be appearing.

In April 2025, Chris Coy and Paul Ben-Victor were cast to guest star as "Waylon Sanders" and recur as Antaan, respectively; Ben-Victor previously voiced Bulldozer of the Easy Company in the first DCU animated series Creature Commandos (2024–present). In late May, Laura Linney was reported to be part of the cast. In August, Cary Christopher was revealed to have a guest-starring role as young Noah, while Brolin claimed in an interview that Paula Patton had a role in the series. Linney's casting was confirmed in May 2026, and in July, she was revealed to be portraying a member of the Guardians of the Universe named Lianna.

=== Design ===
Cynthia Summers and John Paino were, respectively, the costume and production designers. The production team created 20 designs for the Lantern before finalizing it. Jordan and Stewart both wear civilian clothing throughout the series, with Jordan's dusty leather jacket and salt-and-pepper hair resembling his appearance in the 1990s Green Lantern comics drawn by Pat Broderick that featured an older Jordan with white streaks of hair. Jordan's Green Lantern suit in the series is a muted, faded green jacket, contrasting the more colorful and poppy green-and-black suits that the characters are typically depicted wearing. The suit's design is reminiscent of the ones in Gabriel Hardman and Corinna Bechko's Green Lantern: Earth One (2018–2020) graphic novels, which also feature a more grounded approach. Summers stated they did not want Jordan's suit to resemble a futuristic sci-fi aesthetic.

=== Filming ===
Principal photography began during the week of February 17, 2025, in Los Angeles, California, as well as at Warner Bros. Studios Burbank in Burbank, California, under the working title Latitude. Armando Salas and Florian Hoffmeister served as cinematographers. The Stewart family home was created on Stage 19 of the Burbank lot. Filming was previously expected to occur in Atlanta, Georgia, from January to June. Gunn and Safran worked with WBD to get the tax credits and studio deals necessary to move the production from Atlanta, where Gunn filmed Superman, to Los Angeles. Safran said they were thrilled to be filming in the city and supporting locals following the January 2025 Southern California wildfires. Scenes set in Rushville, Nebraska were filmed in Piru, California, with its main street location doubling for downtown Rushville. A diner was also built in the town while the wardrobe department was located in the town's Corazon de Piru business. Hawes said comparisons to True Detective were valid due to Mundy's writing and the buddy cop structure, but Lanterns had more humor than that series. He compared it to films with "Americana heart" such as Fargo (1996) and No Country for Old Men (2007). Mundy said Hawes's direction for the first two episodes captured the scope he was hoping for.

Williams, Patel, and Sakharov directed additional episodes for the series. Four episodes had been filmed by early May, when Hawes wrapped filming his episodes. At that time, filming was about to begin on the third and fourth episodes. Ritter said that the story was "jumping all around". Filming was more than halfway finished by mid-June, and Thomsen said filming for his scenes concluded by the end of July. Pierre confirmed that production had wrapped by at least that October. He also said that the filmmakers extensively discussed the characters' flaws on set, and noted that the characters "do their best to redeem themselves actively".

=== Post-production ===
Emily E. Greene was an editor on the series.

=== Music ===
Stephanie Economou was revealed to be composing the score for the series in May 2026.

== Marketing ==
Promotional on-set image of Aaron Pierre and Kyle Chandler, which revealed their grounded civilian costumes and was subject to much discussion about the series' tone and approach to the characters.

A first-look promotional image of Pierre's John Stewart and Chandler's Hal Jordan was released in February 2025. Armando Tinoco of Deadline Hollywood described the pair as "looking ready for action", while Rachel Leishman at The Mary Sue admired their appearances, dubbing the image "hot". She questioned whether the extent of Jordan's role would be limited to a single season because the image only featured one Green Lantern power ring. Germain Lussier at Gizmodo was surprised by the grounded tone and the characters' civilian clothing, describing it as depicting "Two dudes, standing on the street, looking like hell. And almost no green at all." He felt the image aligned with the series's Earth-based setting and was what DC Studios was ready to show, considering that filming had only recently started. He expected later promotional material to depict some more cosmic elements. Other commentators also addressed the notable absence of the characters' traditional Green Lantern suits and how the image's gritty and grounded tone contrasted the superhero and space opera aspects that many would have expected from a Green Lantern adaptation.

A teaser trailer was shown at HBO Max's upfront presentation in São Paulo, Brazil, on November 25, 2025. Matthew Aguilar at ComicBook.com felt the footage offered exciting elements and "plenty of room for rich dynamics" between Jordan and Stewart, as well as how the series incorporates the characters' cosmic aspects while maintaining focus on the grounded plot. The first footage was released on December 12 during an HBO Max sizzle reel for their 2026 projects, with Marco Vito Oddo of ComicBook.com opining that the footage conveyed Jordan and Stewart's "friction-heavy" relationship while establishing the stakes as being "life and death at the very beginning". The teaser trailer was released online on March 4, 2026, a day earlier than intended after it had leaked online. Discussion of the teaser trailer focused on the grounded True Detective buddy cop nature of the series and its correlation to the Green Lantern mythos. While Jennifer Ouellette at Ars Technica felt the teaser was light on revealing plot details, she described it as "tonally unique for the DCU" and one of her most-anticipated series for the year. Joe George at Den of Geek commended that Chandler "fully looks the part" of the older Jordan from the 1990s Green Lantern comics. He contrasted Jordan's calm yet cocky demeanour to Mel Gibson's Martin Riggs from the Lethal Weapon films and Andy Samberg's Jake Peralta from the television series Brooklyn Nine-Nine (2013–2021). Some commentators questioned the absence of the more fantastical elements typically associated with the Green Lantern characters, comparing Lanterns more to the X-Men film Logan (2017) as well as the television series Yellowstone (2018–2024) and Reacher (2022–present). The teaser featured the song "State Trooper" by Bruce Springsteen, but was temporarily taken down the following month due to an expired music license, before being re-uploaded with a different musical score. Nick Romano at Entertainment Weekly explained that this was a "fairly common practice when it comes to trailer and teaser assets that contain licensed tracks", and refuted speculation that its removal stemmed from comments Lindelof made joking about the lack of the color green in marketing up to that point.

A second teaser trailer was released on May 18, 2026. The trailer was noted by commentators for the appearances of Linney and Thomsen's Sinestro; the discussion of fear, relating to the Yellow Lantern Corps; and for showcasing Jordan wearing his Green Lantern suit and using his power ring to create green constructs, both of which were not present in previous marketing material. George further praised Chandler's performance and noted that "many of the promos and interviews leading into the show have been strangely reluctant to embrace the franchise's sci-fi roots, [...] even stripping the color green from the series' title and marketing". Tom Power at TechRadar believed the inclusion of such elements in this trailer was a direct response to criticsm and concerns about the lack of comics-accurate aspects in the first trailer, while Scott Davis at SciFiNow felt the trailer was an improvement over the first, calling it "much more impressive". The official trailer was revealed at San Diego Comic-Con on July 24, 2026, during a panel at Hall H; the panel was joined by the series's co-creators Mundy, Lindelof, and King, alongside cast members Pierre, Chandler, Dillahunt, Jagannathan, and Fillion. At the panel, Mundy revealed Linney's role.

== Release ==
Lanterns premiered on August 16, 2026, airing on HBO and streaming on HBO Max, and consists of eight episodes, which were released weekly until October 4. It is part of the DCU's Chapter One: Gods and Monsters. In February 2025, Gunn and Safran stated that they could "safely" say the series would premiere in early 2026. In November 2025, the series was reaffirmed for an expected early 2026 debut in Warner Bros. Discovery's third-quarter shareholder letter. However, at the end of the month, HBO and HBO Max chairman and CEO Casey Bloys announced that Lanterns would premiere at the "end of summer" 2026. In March 2026, the series was revealed to premiere that August.

== Reception ==
=== Viewership ===
The premiere attracted 9.3 million viewers worldwide during its first three days on HBO and HBO Max, including 6.6 million in the United States. Its U.S. premiere audience surpassed those of several recent HBO series, such as It: Welcome to Derry (2025–present) and The Penguin (2024), and became the biggest premiere for a DC Studios series on HBO Max. The third episode reached a series high of 10 million viewers worldwide and 7 million in the U.S. during its first three days. The series continued to grow week-to-week, with its pilot episode surpassing 20 million viewers worldwide. It also ranked among the five biggest series launches in HBO Max history. The penultimate episode was watched by 7 million viewers in the United States during its first three days, combining Nielsen's linear television measurements with HBO Max streams. The figure made it the series' most-watched episode in the U.S. at the time, while the series averaged more than 12 million U.S. viewers and nearly 19 million worldwide per episode. The season finale drew 10.5 million global viewers in its first three days, a 13% increase over the series premiere. The series averaged 19.3 million global viewers across the season, while its premiere was approaching over 30 million.

=== Critical response ===
On review aggregator Rotten Tomatoes, 92% of 168 critics gave the season a positive review, with an average rating of 7.85/10. The website's critics' consensus reads, "Lanterns lights the way to a controlled and fantastical escape, in which Kyle Chandler and Aaron Pierre bring audiences into their world of wonder through fearless performances, grounded writing, and charismatic chemistry." Metacritic, which uses a weighted average, assigned a score of 72 out of 100 based on 38 critics, indicating "generally favorable" reviews.

Daniel Fienberg of The Hollywood Reporter praised the series for its "prickly chemistry" between Pierre and Chandler and its strong supporting cast, while noting that its comic-book elements can feel underwhelming and that some episodes are duller and less thematically developed. Alison Herman of Variety praised the character study of Jordan and Stewart and the exploration of John's experiences as a Black superhero, while criticizing the series for relying heavily on influences from other prestige dramas and for struggling to reconcile its grounded approach with its superhero elements. William Bibbiani of TheWrap highlighted the series' increasingly complex characters, relationships, and comic-book references, particularly Stewart's backstory and the "prickliest of interactions" between him and Jordan, as well as the action sequences, but criticized the series for featuring "too much talking, scene repetition and narrative padding".

Jesen Schedeen of IGN described the first episode as a successful blend of superhero drama and grounded murder mystery, highlighting the chemistry between Chandler and Pierre, but noted its limited focus on the cosmic side of the Green Lantern mythos. Ben Travers of IndieWire gave the series an A-, praising its blend of superhero science fiction and police mystery, its exploration of racial discrimination, and the performances of the two leads. Amon Warmann of Empire gave the series 4 out of 5 stars, praising its grounded mystery, the strong performances, and the "entertainingly easy friend-foe chemistry" between Chandler and Pierre, as well as its exploration of racial themes, while noting its slow pacing and limited traditional superhero elements.
