= Character development =

Character development may refer to:

- Characterization, how characters are represented and given detail in a narrative
  - Character arc, the change in characterization of a dynamic character over the course of a narrative
- Character creation, especially for games
- Character Development! (2020), an EP by Underscores
- Experience point (character advancement), increase in scores and other changes of a game character; for example, in role-playing video games
- Moral character, a term used in many educational systems to indicate a strategy for the maturation of individual students

== See also ==
- Character derailment
