= John Stewart (character) =

Comic book superhero

- John Stewart as depicted on the cover of Green Lantern John Stewart, Global Guardians #1 (November 2024). Art by Jamal Campbell.

Publication information
- Publisher: DC Comics
- First appearance: Green Lantern (vol. 2) #87 (January 1972)
- Created by: Dennis O'Neil; Neal Adams

In-story information
- Full name: John Marshall Stewart
- Species: Human
- Team affiliations: Green Lantern Corps; Justice League; U.S. Marine Corps; Indigo Tribe
- Partnerships: Green Lantern partners: Katma Tui; Hal Jordan; Guy Gardner; Kilowog; Kyle Rayner; Other superhero partners: The Flash / Wally West; The Flash / Barry Allen; Steel / John Henry Irons; Martian Manhunter / J'onn J'onnz
- Notable aliases: Green Lantern; The Master Builder; Darkstar; Emerald Knight
- Abilities: Master hand-to-hand combatant and martial artist; Master marksman; Master tactician and strategist; Skilled architect; Use of power ring grants: Flight; Force field; Energy projection; Enhanced strength, speed, senses, and durability; Generation of hard-light constructs; Real-time translation of all languages; Space travel; Galactic encyclopedia; Limited cellular regeneration

John Marshall Stewart is one of the superheroes known as Green Lantern that appear in American comic books published by DC Comics. One of the first African-American superheroes to appear in DC Comics, the character was created by Dennis O'Neil and Neal Adams, and first appeared in Green Lantern (Volume 2) #87 (January 1972). The concept for the character came from Adams' idea of a substitute Green Lantern that better reflected the racial makeup of the world's population. John Stewart, a college graduate and architect, was conceived by Adams to portray a better representation of Black People in America, with Adams also diverging from the usual lighter coloring of black characters to depict him as dark-skinned, basing Stewart's design on actor Sidney Poitier. Stewart was introduced in his debut issue and origin story as an anti-authority figure symbolizing Black Power politics. He notably refused to wear a mask, breaking superhero tradition. The early 1980s saw Stewart become the main Green Lantern. In 2007, Geoff Johns changed the character to be a former U.S. Marine in Green Lantern (Volume 4) #26 following his 2001 Justice League cartoon depiction, with which Bruce Timm removed Stewart's original "militant", "Black Panther Party"-esque characterization in favor of a military background.

Today, John Stewart is one of the most popular and high-profile black characters in American comic books. Although a starring character in Green Lantern comics since the 1970s, he had a relatively low profile in mainstream popular culture until his adaptation for the 2000s animated series Justice League and Justice League Unlimited, voiced by Phil LaMarr. This led to an increase in the character's profile in comics, including a starring role in Justice League comics, and a massive expansion in the character's availability in DC Comics toys and merchandise. Aaron Pierre portrays the character in the DC Universe, beginning with the television series Lanterns (2026).

== Publication history ==
=== Creation and development ===
External images
- The cover artwork for Green Lantern vol. 2 #87, John Stewart's first appearance.
- John Stewart refuses to wear a mask in the same issue, a deviation from superhero tradition.

John Stewart debuted in Green Lantern vol. 2 #87 (December 1971/January 1972) when artist Neal Adams came up with the idea of a substitute Green Lantern. The decision to make the character African American-descent resulted from a conversation between Adams and editor Julius Schwartz, in which Adams recounts saying that given the racial makeup of the world's population, "we ought to have a black Green Lantern, not because we're liberals, but because it just makes sense." Adams created John Stewart as "a college graduate who has a profession", wanting to avoid the prevailing depictions of black people at the time who he stated "don't represent the aspirations of every Black person in America", such as gangbangers. Dennis O'Neil wrote the script for Stewart's debut issue in line with Adams' intention for the character, making him a college graduate and an architect, unemployed because of the significant percentage of unemployment for black people in America in the time period. In the original script, the character's name was Lincoln Washington, which was chosen by Schwartz. Adams confronted Schwartz about the name being a slave name, after which Schwartz told Adams to choose the character's new name, and Adams chose "John Stewart". Adams intentionally colored the character a darker brown, rather than the usual lighter, khaki-like coloring done on black characters at the time. DC production manager Sol Harrison asked Adams about his divergence from the usual colors for black characters, to which he replied, "Most Black people I know are pretty dark. There are some very light-skinned people, but not John Stewart." Schwartz and Harrison initially expressed reluctance on the coloring for fear of offending black people, but went through with it after Adams stated that he does not think they would be offended by dark-skinned black characters. Stewart's original design was based on actor Sidney Poitier and he was one of the first African-American superheroes to appear in DC Comics. The character was DC's third superhero of African ancestry.

Stewart's debut issue and origin story, titled "Beware My Power!", introduced Stewart as headstrong, anti-authority, and race-conscious, a symbolism of Black Power politics, with Stewart initially conflicting with the primary, white Green Lantern, Hal Jordan. When one of the Guardians of the Universe tell Jordan that he is appointing Stewart as his substitute, Jordan sees Stewart standing up to two white policemen hassling black men and is displeased, viewing Stewart as disrespectful and having a chip on his shoulder, to which the Guardian responds, "He has all due qualifications! And we are not interested in your petty bigotries!" Feeling it was unnecessary to hide his identity, Stewart refuses to wear a mask, breaking superhero tradition. The story featured Stewart's first mission, wherein he unwillingly accepts Hal Jordan's assignment of protecting a racist politician, whose scheme of instigating a race riot Stewart later exposed.

After the issue, Stewart made scarce appearances until he became the main, full-time Green Lantern in the early 1980s.

=== Legacy ===
"So anyway, now we have John Stewart. And I can tell you when I go to conventions I have adult Black males standing in front of me and they cry because of John Stewart, because they've been waiting their whole lifetime for a non-gangbanger. non-tribal-chief, college-educated Black man to be in comic books. They like that; like it a lot.”

— Neal Adams, 2010

"If you ask a kid who Green Lanterns [sic] is, the kid will say it's John Stewart.”

— Neal Adams, 2011

John Stewart has become a major recurring character in the Green Lantern mythos within the DC Universe. He became the primary character of Green Lantern vol. 2 from issues #182 through #200, when Hal Jordan relinquished his place in the Green Lantern Corps (1984–1986). He continued to star in the book when the title changed to The Green Lantern Corps from issue #201 to #224 (1986–1988). He would continue to make key appearances in Action Comics Weekly after The Green Lantern Corps' cancellation (1988). He starred in the comic Green Lantern: Mosaic, which DC spun out of Green Lantern vol. 3, with a four-part storyline titled "Mosaic" (issues #14–17). DC published 18 issues of the ongoing Green Lantern: Mosaic title between June 1992 and November 1993.

In 2011, John Stewart starred in the New 52 relaunch of Green Lantern Corps alongside Guy Gardner, and became the sole lead character of the title from 2013 until the series' conclusion in 2015. Green Lantern Corps was replaced by Green Lantern: The Lost Army, which also stars John Stewart as the lead. In November 2022, it was announced, as a part of the Dawn of DC relaunch, Stewart would star in a new miniseries entitled Green Lantern: War Journal, written by Phillip Kennedy Johnson and illustrated by Osvaldo Montos.

=== Marine retcon ===
John Stewart was chosen by Bruce Timm as the Green Lantern in the 2001 television cartoon Justice League. As the series creator, Timm changed the character into a "no-nonsense" former U.S. Marine member. Timm gave him a military background because of his disinterest of portraying him "to the militant Black Panther Party from the early '70s" because he viewed it as currently being irrelevant, and also because he wanted his ring to only produce beams instead of constructs. Geoff Johns incorporated the marine background into the comic version of the character in 2007's Green Lantern vol. 4 #26.

== Character biography ==
=== Early years ===
John Stewart is an architect, later "retconned" into a veteran U.S. Marine from Detroit, Michigan, who was selected by the Guardians as a backup Green Lantern to then-current Green Lantern Hal Jordan after the previous backup, Guy Gardner, was seriously injured after getting hit by a car while trying to save a civilian. Although Jordan objected to the decision after seeing that Stewart had a belligerent attitude to authority figures, the Guardians stood by their decision and chided Jordan for his supposed bigoted outlook on the issue. Jordan explained that he just felt that even though Stewart might have the integrity for the task, he "obviously would have a chip on his shoulder bigger than the rock of Gibraltar."

Jordan's opinion was that Stewart's first mission began badly. His assignment was to protect a racist politician, and Stewart, while averting an accident, took advantage of the situation to embarrass Jordan in the process. When an assassin shoots at the politician, Stewart does not intervene with Jordan in response to the attack, which initially makes Stewart seem suspect. However, it turns out Stewart had good reasons for this apparent dereliction of duty because he was stopping a gunman from killing a police officer in the outside parking lot at the event while Jordan was pursuing a decoy. When Jordan confronts Stewart about his actions, Stewart explains that the politician had staged the attack for political advantage. Jordan then concludes that Stewart was an excellent recruit and has proven his worth.

For some time, Stewart occasionally filled in as Green Lantern when Jordan was unavailable, including for some missions of the Justice League.

After Jordan gave up being Green Lantern in the 1980s, the Guardians selected Stewart for full-time duty. Stewart filled that role for some years. During that period he worked as an architect at Ferris Aircraft Company, battled many Green Lantern villains, and fought against the Anti-Monitor's forces during the Crisis on Infinite Earths. John was trained in usage of his power ring by Katma Tui, the Green Lantern of the planet Korugar. The duo went on many adventures together and eventually fell in love. Katma and John went on to serve within the Green Lantern Corps of Earth alongside Hal Jordan, Arisia Rrab, Kilowog, Salaak, and other alien Green Lanterns, during which time they were married.

After John's ring was rendered powerless through the schemes of Sinestro, and Katma Tui was murdered by Star Sapphire, Stewart's life began to unravel. First, he was falsely accused of killing Carol Ferris, Star Sapphire's alter ego, and then falsely accused of theft by South Nambia (a fictional nation within the DC universe similar to apartheid-era South Africa). Jailed and tortured in South Nambia for weeks, John freed himself with his old ring, now re-powered thanks to the efforts of Hal Jordan. In his escape, John inadvertently frees both a serial killer and a terrorist. When Jordan confronts John over his actions, the two friends come to blows until John realizes the "revolutionaries" he had been aiding intended to murder innocent civilians.

=== Cosmic Odyssey ===
Afterwards, John left Earth for space, where he participated in the Cosmic Odyssey miniseries event, and failed to prevent the destruction of the planet Xanshi by an avatar of the Anti-Life Equation. The incident earned him the ire of Martian Manhunter, who was with him at the time. This series of tragedies left John a shattered man on the brink of suicide and created the villainess known as Fatality, the sole survivor of Xanshi. Martian Manhunter has since, at least civilly, forgiven him.

=== Green Lantern: Mosaic ===
John finally forgave himself for his past mistakes and grew into a stronger, more complex hero when he became the caretaker of the "Mosaic World", a patchwork of communities from multiple planets that had been brought to Oa by an insane Guardian who had invaded John's mind. Although bitter and sullen at his assignment at first, he overcame this and, using his formidable intellect and talent for unconventional thinking, Stewart forged the Mosaic into a new society and eventually became the first mortal Guardian of the Universe, known as the Master Builder. As his reward for this new level of awareness, John was reunited with his late wife, Katma Tui. However, tragedy struck once again and Hal Jordan, possessed by Parallax, destroyed both the Guardians and the Central Power Battery, robbing John of his newfound powers and his resurrected wife.

=== Darkstars and beyond ===
Following "Emerald Twilight" and the collapse of the Green Lantern Corps, Stewart was recruited by the Controllers to command the Darkstars, another interstellar peacekeeping force. Using the new resources at his command, Stewart evacuated the Mosaic cities from Oa prior to its destruction and served the Darkstars with distinction until he was crippled in battle with Grayven on the planet Rann. Stewart eventually regained the use of his legs as a parting gift from Jordan before Jordan sacrificed himself to destroy the Sun-Eater during the 1996 "The Final Night" storyline. As a result of Jordan healing him, he began to exhibit random bursts of energy from his hands that he was able to discharge on three different occasions. Though he had initially refused a new Green Lantern ring months prior, he eventually accepted a new one entrusted to Kyle Rayner by a time-lost Hal Jordan, and joined the Justice League to fill in for Rayner as he took an extended leave of absence from Earth.

=== New Green Lantern Corps ===
With the return of Hal Jordan and the Guardians, the Corps has been reorganized. Each sector of space now has two Green Lanterns assigned to it, and Stewart and Jordan now share regular duty for Earth's sector, 2814. After the dissolution of the Justice League in the aftermath of the 2004 miniseries Identity Crisis, and the destruction of their Watchtower headquarters on the moon, Stewart has begun playing a larger role in metahuman affairs, working with many former Justice Leaguers.

During the "52" storyline, John Stewart alongside Hal Jordan are involved in one of the first post-Freedom of Power Treaty confrontations. After a battle with the Great Ten and Black Adam, John and Hal are escorted to Russian airspace by the Rocket Red Brigade.

During the opening One Year Later storyline of Green Lantern, Hal Jordan tells Green Arrow that John Stewart is on an off-world undercover mission. The details John Stewart disguised himself as the bounty hunter "Hunger Dog" to undercover in Europe. When John hears that Hal Jordan is being held captive by Amon Sur and Loragg, he goes off to rescue him. This led to a confrontation with Amon Sur, who turns out to be the son of their predecessor, Abin Sur. During the fight, Amon receives a ring from the Sinestro Corps and vanishes.

In Justice League of America vol. 2, #7, he and Wonder Woman designed one of the League's new headquarters, The Hall. John later resumes his role as the League's resident Green Lantern upon Hal Jordan's request.

=== Sinestro Corps War ===
In the Green Lantern: Sinestro Corps Special, the Green Lantern Corps are attacked by Bedovian, the sniper of the Sinestro Corps, who is capable of taking out a target from three sectors away, all from the inside of a red Sun-Eater. After Bedovian takes out several Green Lanterns, John Stewart uses his power ring as a scoped sniper rifle to track the nearby sectors. He eventually discovers Bedovian's hiding spot and shoots him. As Green Lantern Corps members were forbidden from killing sentient beings at that time, Bedovian survived the attack, as seen in the "Blackest Night" crossover. John and Guy Gardner are captured by Lyssa Drak and taken back to Qward, where the two Lanterns are held captive. Hal manages to defeat Lyssa and free John and Guy from their nightmares, while the Lost Lanterns recover Ion. The earth-based Lanterns then return home, only to find that New Earth, as the center of the Multiverse, is the Sinestro Corps' next target.

The Sinestro Corps and the Manhunters invade Earth. Cyborg Superman and Superboy-Prime attack Superman, while Hal confronts Parallax, who has possessed Kyle Rayner, just before the latter is about to kill Hal's family. John orders Guy to retrieve a painting by Kyle Rayner's mother. When Parallax absorbs Hal inside himself, John looks on with sudden shock. Guy returns and shoves the painting into Parallax's eyesight, allowing Hal to use it to help Kyle overcome his fears and expel Parallax. Now in its original form, Parallax is then contained by Ganthet and Sayd within the Power Batteries of Hal, John, Guy, and Kyle. Ganthet and Sayd then reveal that they are no longer Guardians. Ganthet gives Kyle a new power ring and asks Kyle to become a Green Lantern again, to which he agrees. The four then race off to finish the fight. At Guy Gardner's suggestion, John and the other Lanterns use Warworld as a gigantic grenade, badly wounding the Anti-Monitor, who is then thrown into space by Superboy-Prime.

John Stewart witnessed Guy being infected by the Sinestro Corps member who is a living virus, named Despotellis, and asked Soranik Natu to help Guy. Soranik used the Green Lantern Corps smallpox virus named Leezle Pon, who stops Despotellis. John Stewart was later approached by the Guardians to become one of the Alpha Lanterns, a new division of the Corps devoted to the internal affairs of the Corps. Stewart, desiring more information about the secrecy of the Alpha Lantern program, declined the offer, to the extreme disappointment of the Guardians.

It has also been revealed that John served in the Marine Corps as a sniper prior to becoming an architect. While the idea of John being a Marine veteran was taken from Justice League, him being a sniper is a new addition to the character's background. During his time in the Marines, John met a young Hal Jordan when he was in the Air Force before they both join the Green Lantern Corps.

During the "Rage of the Red Lanterns" story arc, John Stewart is one of the guards assigned to escort Sinestro to Korugar to face execution. However, the Green Lanterns are ambushed by the Sinestro Corps and then the Red Lantern Corps under Atrocitus. The Green Lanterns are left to die in space after Atrocitus captures Sinestro, but they are saved by Saint Walker. John, however, is infected with the Red Lanterns' rage. Walker conjures up a blue energy construct of Katma Tui, who heals John and calms him by showing him a vision of flying with Katma. John later tells Kilowog that he is going to see Katma again, saying that "the universe said so". In that same issue, Fatality is converted into a Star Sapphire, and orders her ring to locate John Stewart. When she tracks down John, she tells him she forgives him, and kisses him. Before departing, she encourages John to forgive himself for what happened to Xanshi.

=== Trinity ===
Stewart appears in the Trinity series. He is the one to first attack the alien creature Konvikt, but his concentration suddenly snaps, and he starts muttering incoherently in binary code. A moment later, he spontaneously generates complex weapons from his body, unrelated to his ring. Later, he attempts to overexert himself to know how he generated those weapons by running a brutal training session against holographic Qwardian Thunderers, which does not work. He later shows Firestorm the machinery used to monitor the Cosmic Egg imprisoning Krona, but as he leaves again, he suffers from a relapse and start generating knives from his uniform, and it is revealed the entire system is broken.

Later, on board the Antimatter Earth Crime Syndicate satellite, he again loses control and nearly brings down the satellite with his blasts. It is revealed these discharges are brought about due to John's absorption of a Qwardian superweapon, the Void Hound, which has been trying to escape its containment, or at least seize control of Stewart. After the sweeping, devastating effects of the spell engineered by Morgaine le Fey and Enigma, he is seen in an Earth under the control of a totalitarian Justice Society, where all Green Lanterns are forbidden to be. He eventually starts breaking down, and with the Void Hound gaining enough hold on him to force him to create a black hole which forces him back to Earth, he has no choice but to comply. The Void Hound is later revealed to be a servant of Krona, and its hold over John is broken when Krona is defeated.

=== Worlds Collide ===
After a massive battle between the JLA and the Shadow Cabinet, John chooses to stay with the League despite many of its members choosing to leave. After Kimiyo Hoshi goes missing while tracking down Shadow Thief, John blackmails the armored vigilante Hardware into helping the team track her down. The League arrives in the Himalayas, discovering Kimiyo and Superman's friend Icon engaged in a fierce battle with Starbreaker. The JLA defeats Starbreaker, and John takes a leave of absence to go to Xanshi.

=== Blackest Night ===
When John visits the grave of planet Xanshi, thousands of black rings fly into the planetary debris, and reconstitute the entire planet. Xanshi itself then speaks to John, telling him "I can help you save them." Against his better judgment, John descends to the planet's surface. Once reaching the surface, John finds himself confronted by Katma Tui and the entire population of Xanshi as Black Lanterns. While battling them all, Katma tries to weaken John by claiming that he caused the planet's destruction. However, John, spurred on by Fatality's words, says that he was not the cause of it all and successfully fights off the Black Lanterns. After escaping Xanshi's atmosphere, John realises that the planet is headed for Earth, along with every Black Lantern in the universe, and contacts Hal, warning him of the impending threat. Later, John is saved by combined efforts of the various Lanterns corps, who had just arrived to battle the Black Lanterns.

=== Brightest Day ===
In the events of Brightest Day, John is seen on Oa, supervising the demolition of the buildings left in ruins after the Black Lanterns attack, and planning the reconstruction. Suddenly, he is called to the Guardians' chamber, where they order him to join Alpha Lantern Boodikka in a mission to Grenda, Stel's homeworld, where communications ceased abruptly without explanation, and Lantern Stel and the population are missing. John agrees and departs with Boodikka.

After arriving on the planet, the two confirmed the Guardians report: the entire population has mysteriously disappeared. John asks Boodikka if something of her older self remains despite being turned into an Alpha Lantern, after she asks him why he refused to join the Alpha Lanterns. Boodikka responds that her changes are only physical, and she still has her former personality; John doubts this affirmation. The two discover what seems to be a Green Lantern House Sector, that, according to Boodikka, is not registered. After entering inside, they discovered Green Lanterns Horoq Nnot and Stel; the last one tells John he must flee from the planet immediately. Suddenly, Boodikka turns against John and attacks him; John fights back, but he's surrounded by more rogue Alpha Lanterns and is defeated. It is revealed that the Alpha Lanterns have begun a revolt against the rest of the Corps, and have allied themselves with the Cyborg Superman (now with an Alpha Lantern battery), taking control of Grenda to use the planet as their hidden base to turn Green Lanterns into Alpha Lanterns. John Stewart is last seen wounded and bleeding, being taken to Henshaw by Boodikka. Cyborg Superman then begins the cosmetic surgery to turn John into another Alpha Lantern.

Before starting the operation, however, Henshaw connects Stewart's brain to his memories to see why he was turned into a cyborg. He also reveals to John, that, after being resurrected by the Manhunters after the Sinestro Corps War, he returned to Earth in the middle of the "Blackest Night", and pleaded to the Black Lanterns (among them are the former crew of his space shuttle) and Nekron to kill him, only to discover that because he did not have a physical heart, he was invisible to them. Angered for being ignored by death itself, the Cyborg Superman encountered the mysterious hooded stranger who abducted the entities of the Emotional Spectrum. He convinced him that Ganthet has the power and knowledge to turn Alpha Lanterns into normal beings again. John realizes that Henshaw organized the revolt of the Alpha Lanterns with the sole purpose to attract Ganthet to the planet Grenda and forced him to turn Henshaw into a mortal being again. Kyle and Soranik burst into the lab and manage to rescue John, but Ganthet is captured. They hide in a cave, where John informs them about the Cyborg Superman's true plan. They also discover the missing robot inhabitants of the planet, trapped in the depths of the cave by Henshaw. Mounting a defense, they battle against Henshaw and his forces, destroying the cyborg's body. Henshaw leaps into Boodikka's body, but her consciousness manages to defeat his, seemingly destroying him. John later joins Kyle Rayner and Ganthet in a mission to the anti-matter universe to save Soranik Natu.

=== War of the Green Lanterns ===
On their return to the matter universe, John and the others are affected by the return of Parallax to the Central Power Battery by Krona. Their previous experience with Parallax allows John, Kyle and Ganthet to escape its control, but they are forced to fight their fellow Green Lanterns. Affected by Parallax's fear powers, John and Kyle are forced to remove their rings and escape through Oa's underground. They then meet up with Guy and Hal, who has the rings of the other corps' leaders. John initially chooses Larfleeze's orange ring, but is convinced by Hal to use Indigo-1's ring instead due to the debilitating effects of the orange ring on the wearer's psyche. When the corrupted Green Lanterns attack, John has difficulty channeling the various corps powers through his ring. Things are made worse when Mogo joins the attack. While Hal and Guy go to remove Parallax from the Central Power Battery, John and Kyle attempt to free Mogo from Krona's control. On the way, John attempts to stop the flow of tainted rings sent by Mogo, but fails. As he and Kyle head for Mogo's core instead, they discover residual Black Lantern energy around it. John absorbs the Black Lantern energy, along with all the Green Lantern energy, and regretfully uses it to destroy Mogo, knowing that they lack the time to heal Mogo before Krona uses it to 'recruit' a wave of reinforcement Green Lanterns. In the fallout, the two regroup with Hal, Guy and Ganthet, using the full power of the emotional spectrum to crack open the Battery and release Parallax. Their job done, the Lanterns regain their original green rings, in preparation for the final confrontation with Krona.

Following the War's conclusion, John assists a new Green Lantern from Sector 282 'selected' during the period when Mogo was under Krona's control in adjusting to the power of her ring despite the possibility that she will not be allowed to keep it by assisting her in halting a war taking place in her sector, the original Lantern for that sector having died during the war. When John is able to help the two sides find a peaceful resolution to their conflict, his new student reflects that, despite John's reputation after destroying two worlds, she now knows that nobody could regret that action more than John himself.

=== The New 52 ===
After Hal's expulsion and Kyle's departure in The New 52, John joins Guy Gardner and others in investigating recent attacks in a distant sector of space, which are revealed to be the result of an old Guardian experiment. At one point, John is forced to kill Kirrt Kallak, another Lantern who was about to give in to torture and reveal the access codes to the Oan defence network. John is approached by the Alpha Lantern to arrest him for that murder. He is found guilty for this crime and sentenced to death. However, Guy Gardner and other fellow Lanterns free him before the execution, resulting in the destruction of the Alpha Lanterns when the Green Lanterns refuse to allow John to be executed. During the fights, the Alpha Lanterns (revealing to the reader that the Guardians set up these events as part of their plans to destroy the Corps) realize that all the Alpha Lanterns had become dangerously mentally unstable. Alpha Lantern Varix caused a reaction which killed all the Alpha Lanterns, including himself.

During the "Rise of the Third Army" storyline, the Guardians contact John and state that Mogo's remains appear to be moving, The Guardians have come to the conclusion that Mogo is trying to reform and assign John to track it. While tracking the Mogo fragment's destination, he is discovered by Fatality, who is seeking a sundered love in danger. After they find Mogo's pieces – realizing that the endangered love is the male and female elements of Mogo's personality trying to come back together- John figures out that the Guardians want to use Mogo. After the villainous First Lantern is destroyed and the unemotional Guardians are killed off by Sinestro, John begins a relationship with Fatality in-between on Mogo.

After the invasion of Durlans, John discovered that a Durlan impersonated Fatality delectably throughout the months. John defeats the imposter and vows to search for the real Fatality. When John locates and reunites with her on the Durlan prison planet, Fatality attacks him. She revealed to him that the Zamarons had influenced her into becoming a Star Sapphire, forcing her to love him when she actually hated him. After John refuses to fight, Fatality leaves, telling John that he and the Star Sapphires are her enemies leaving John in sorrow.

=== DC Rebirth ===
Following the events of Green Lantern: Lost Army and Green Lantern Corps: Edge of Oblivion leading to DC Rebirth, John and the rest of the Green Lantern Corps return to their universe and are about to attack Warworld when it is destroyed by Hal Jordan. After meeting up with a previously captured Guy Gardner and newly turned Sinestro Corp leader Soranik Natu and saving the Xudarian homeworld from a joint invasion from Brainiac and Larfleeze, the remains of both corps join forces.

=== Infinite Frontier ===
During an intergalactic summit between the Guardians of the Universe and the United Planets, the Green Lantern Corps is recalled to Oa. After terrorists disrupt the event, killing one of the Guardians, John Stewart along with one thousand Green Lanterns, is dispatched to investigate the Dark Sectors where he comes into conflict with the apocalyptic schemes of the New God, Esak.

=== Dawn of DC ===
When the United Planets take control of the Green Lantern Corps and quarantine Sector 2814, reassigning all of its Lanterns to elsewhere in the galaxy, John retires and chooses to remain on Earth with his mother, who is suffering from dementia. To protect her from grief, he creates a hard light construct of his deceased younger sister Ellie. When John is attacked and infected by the Radiant Dead, a necropathic group of corrupted Lanterns and constructs serving the Revenant Queen, he is forced to leave Earth to cure himself and stop the zombie-like horde from destroying the galaxy, teaming up with Caolán Shepherd, a Green Lantern from an alternate universe.

John would later take on a starring role in Jeremy Adams' and Morgan Hampton's run on Green Lantern Corps (2025–present). In this run, John was notably reunited with his once long-deceased wife Katma Tui, with a version of Katma from Hypertime returning to the main DC Universe alive. In Geoffrey Thorne's mini-series, John had previously been split into two versions of himself, with one returning to the Green Lantern Corps and the other going off into the Dark Sectors to look for Katma. During Hampton's run, the John that had returned to the Green Lanterns died after sacrificing re-power the Source Battery on Oa, with his ring finding the other John having successfully found and living with Katma Tui.

== Powers and abilities ==
As a Green Lantern, John Stewart is semi-invulnerable, capable of projecting hard-light constructions, flight, and utilizing various other abilities which are only limited by his imagination and willpower. Unlike other Green Lanterns, Stewart does not wear a physical ring, with his body acting as a ring and his heart a battery.

== Other versions ==
Several alternate universe versions of John Stewart have appeared throughout the character's publication history.

- Power Ring, a counterpart of Stewart from the antimatter universe, is a member of the Crime Syndicate of America.
- In Flashpoint, Stewart is a member of Team 7, an elite unit of soldiers led by Grifter, until he is killed during a botched attack on a terrorist base.
- In Absolute Green Lantern, Stewart is an architect living in Evergreen, Nevada who was granted the power of the Gold Flame of Enlightenment by Abin Sur.

== In other media ==
=== Television ===
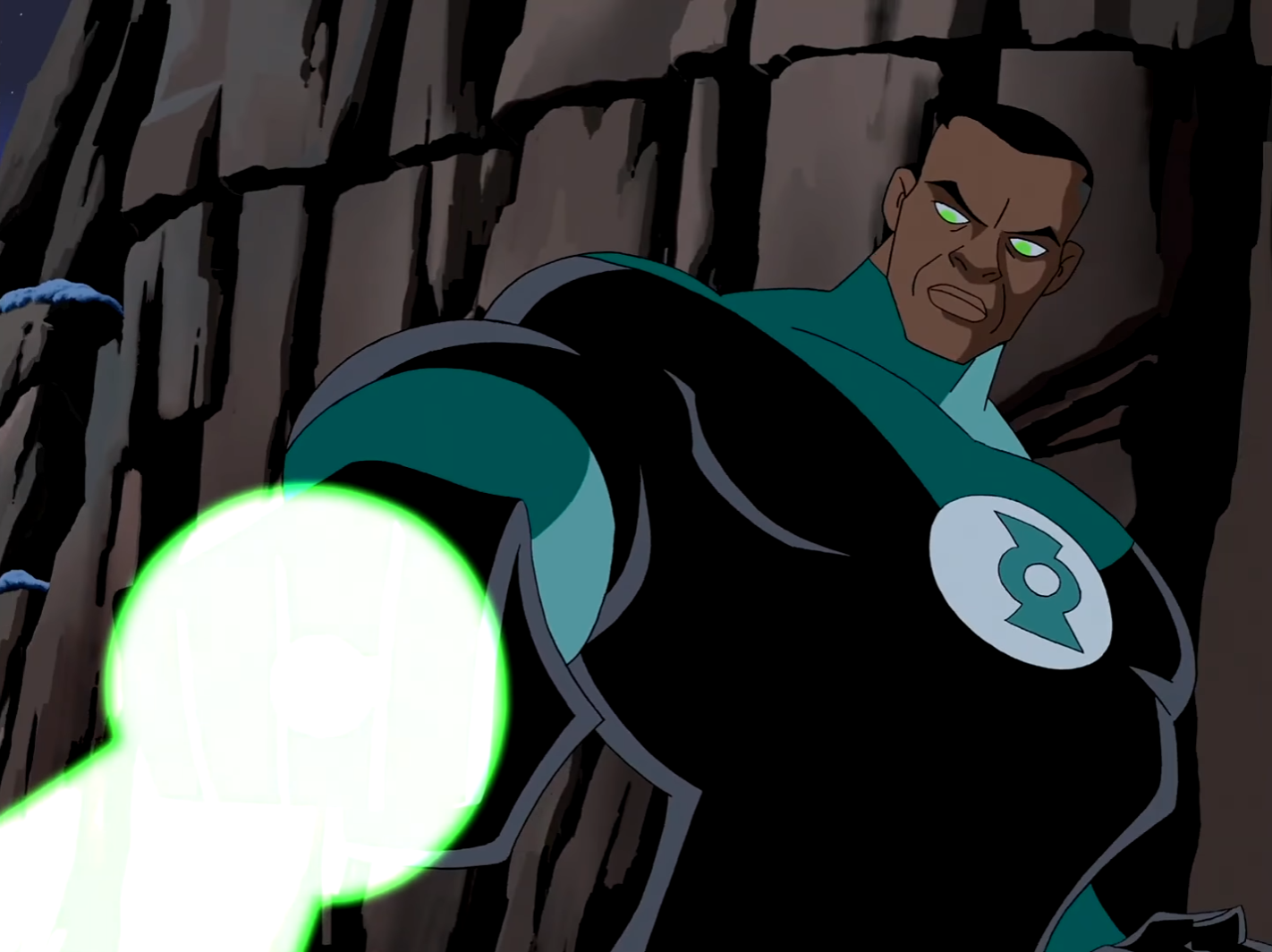
Green Lantern in the Justice League TV series

- John Stewart appears in a Saturday Night Live sketch inspired by The Death of Superman, portrayed by Tim Meadows.
- John Stewart appears in series set in the DC Animated Universe (DCAU), voiced by Phil LaMarr.
  - First appearing in Justice League, this version is a former United States Marine and founding member of the eponymous team whose eyes glow green as a side effect of prolonged exposure to his power ring's energy. Additionally, he is able to affect yellow objects. Throughout the series, he forms a relationship with teammate Hawkgirl, though a rift develops between them following the three-part series finale "Starcrossed", and temporarily joins the Easy Company after losing his powers while traveling through time to stop Vandal Savage in the three-part episode "The Savage Time".
    - Additionally, an alternate universe incarnation of Stewart who became a member of the Justice Lords appears in the two-part episode "A Better World".
  - Stewart makes guest appearances in Static Shock. In the two-part episode "A League of Their Own", he and the League join forces with Static and Gear to defeat Brainiac after he takes over the Watchtower. In the episode "Fallen Hero", Stewart seeks out Static's help after Sinestro steals his power battery and frames him for several crimes.
  - Stewart appears in Justice League Unlimited. As of this series, he has begun dating Vixen, but retains feelings for Hawkgirl and displays a soldier's attitude in his personal life. Additionally, he encounters his and Hawkgirl's future son Rex Stewart / Warhawk while traveling through time to stop Chronos.
- John Stewart makes a non-speaking cameo appearance in the Duck Dodgers episode "The Green Loontern".
- John Stewart appears in Young Justice, voiced by Kevin Michael Richardson. This version is a member of the Justice League and Black Lightning's ex-brother-in-law.
- According to co-developer Giancarlo Volpe, John Stewart was meant to appear in Green Lantern: The Animated Series before its cancellation.
- John Stewart makes non-speaking cameo appearances in Teen Titans Go!.
- Elements of John Stewart are incorporated into the Arrowverse character John Diggle, a military veteran who takes a job as Oliver Queen's bodyguard and later the vigilante Spartan. Additionally, Diggle has an estranged stepfather, Roy Stewart, and thus refuses to use the surname himself.
- John Stewart makes non-speaking appearances in Harley Quinn as a member of the Justice League.
- John Stewart appears in Batwheels.

=== Film ===
- John Stewart was meant to appear in Justice League: Mortal, with the role being originally offered to Columbus Short before Common was ultimately cast in the role. The film would have been developed by Warner Bros. Pictures from a script by Michele and Kieran Mulroney and directed by George Miller. However, the film was pushed back due to the 2007–08 Writers Guild of America strike and the Australian Film Commission refusing to house filming over tax incentive disagreements. Two years into production, the film was canceled.
- John Stewart appears in the DC Animated Movie Universe (DCAMU) films Justice League Dark and Justice League Dark: Apokolips War, voiced by Roger Cross. This version is a member of the Justice League until he is killed defending the Green Lantern Corps from Darkseid.
- John Stewart was intended to appear in the DC Extended Universe (DCEU) film Green Lantern Corps.
- John Stewart appears in Teen Titans Go! To the Movies, voiced by Lil Yachty.
- The Red Son incarnation of John Stewart appears in Superman: Red Son, voiced again by Phil LaMarr.
- John Stewart was intended to appear in the DCEU film Zack Snyder's Justice League, portrayed by Wayne T. Carr, but Warner Bros. Pictures and DC Films denied director Zack Snyder access as it would have conflicted with their plans for him at the time.
- John Stewart makes a cameo appearance in Space Jam: A New Legacy, portrayed by an uncredited actor.
- John Stewart appears in Teen Titans Go! & DC Super Hero Girls: Mayhem in the Multiverse, voiced again by Phil LaMarr.
- John Stewart appears in the Tomorrowverse films Green Lantern: Beware My Power and Justice League: Crisis on Infinite Earths, voiced by Aldis Hodge. This version is a Medal of Honor recipient who received his ring following Ganthet's death.

==== DC Universe ====
John Stewart / Green Lantern appears in media set in the DC Universe (DCU) franchise, portrayed by Aaron Pierre. This version is a former Green Lantern recruit trained by Hal Jordan whose ring he inherited, albeit powered by a Lantern created by Sinestro and imbued with the power of will and fear.

- John Stewart debuts in the HBO series Lanterns. He was an infant when Abin Sur crashed on Earth. The ring tested his father, John Stewart Sr., as a Green Lantern, but rejected him when he showed fear. After a visiting Guardian noted the infant's potential instead, John's parents relentlessly pushed him toward the role. Years later, Hal Jordan is forced to train John, whom Hal initially resents as an unwanted successor. When Hal's Green Lantern career implodes, John rejects the position out of disillusionment, leaving Guy Gardner to take the job. A decade later, Hal's murder drags John back to finally accept his childhood destiny.
- Stewart is slated to appear in the film Man of Tomorrow.

=== Video games ===
- John Stewart appears in Justice League: Injustice for All.
- John Stewart appears in Justice League: Chronicles.
- John Stewart appears as a playable character in Justice League Heroes, voiced by Michael Jai White.
- John Stewart appears in DC Universe Online, voiced by Ken Thomas. Since 2012, he has been voiced by George Washington III.
- John Stewart appears as a downloadable alternate skin for Hal Jordan in Injustice: Gods Among Us, voiced again by Phil LaMarr.
- John Stewart as a Green and Indigo Lantern appears as a character summon in Scribblenauts Unmasked: A DC Comics Adventure.
- John Stewart appears as a NPC in Young Justice: Legacy, voiced again by Kevin Michael Richardson.
- John Stewart appears as a playable character in Lego Batman 3: Beyond Gotham, voiced by Ike Amadi.
- John Stewart appears as a "premier skin" for Hal Jordan in Injustice 2, voiced again by Phil LaMarr.
- John Stewart appears as a playable character in Lego DC Super-Villains, voiced by Nyambi Nyambi.
- John Stewart appears as a playable character in Teen Titans Go! Figure.
- John Stewart appears in Justice League: Cosmic Chaos, voiced by Terrence C. Carson.
- John Stewart appears as a boss in Suicide Squad: Kill the Justice League, voiced by Dan White. This version is a member of the Justice League.

=== Merchandise ===
John Stewart was considered to receive an action figure in the proposed fourth wave of Kenner Products' "Super Powers Collection". Despite this, he has received figures in other toy lines.

=== Miscellaneous ===
- A hologram of John Stewart appears in Legion of Super Heroes in the 31st Century #6.
- John Stewart appears in Smallville Season 11 as a detective for the New York Police Department and Clark Kent's mentor.
- The DCAU incarnation of John Stewart appears in a flashback in the tie-in comic Justice League Beyond. Sometime after the events of Justice League Unlimited, Vixen was fatally wounded by the Shadow Thief on the night Stewart planned to propose to her. While working with Hawkgirl and Adam Strange to avenge Vixen, Stewart kills Shadow Thief by shooting him and leaving him to be eaten alive by beasts to save Hawkgirl's life, which the Green Lantern Corps consequently removes his ring, with it being passed onto Kai-Ro decades later, and retires from the Justice League. Following these events, he would eventually marry Hawkgirl, who would later give birth to Rex Stewart.
- John Stewart appears in the Injustice: Gods Among Us prequel comic. Upon learning from the Guardians of the Universe of Superman's growing tyranny and Hal Jordan going rogue, Stewart joins his fellow Corpsmen in apprehending the latter before secretly allowing him to escape, believing Superman has good intentions. Stewart accompanies Jordan in returning to Earth and joining Superman's Regime in enforcing global peace. Seven months later, Guy Gardner attempts to reason with Superman, but the latter breaks his arm. Seeing Superman for the tyrant he has become, Stewart tries to intervene, only to be killed by Sinestro.
- John Stewart appears in the crossover miniseries DC X Sonic the Hedgehog.

== Reception ==
IGN ranked John Stewart as the 55th greatest comic book hero of all time describing him as one of the first dominant African-American heroes in the pages of DC Comics; IGN also stated that John Stewart has gone from "semi-obscurity in the mainstream to absolute recognition" thanks to his starring role in the DCAU.
