= Wiener (surname) =

Wiener is a surname. Notable people with the surname include:

- Alexander S. Wiener (1907–1976), American forensic medicine, serology, and immunogenetics
- Alfred Wiener (1885–1964), German Jewish campaigner against Nazism and anti-semitism
- Anna Wiener, American writer
- Charles Wiener (1851–1913), Austrian-French scientist-explorer
- Christian Wiener (1826–1896), German mathematician
- Daniel Wiener (born 1954), American sculptor
- Deanna Wiener (born 1953), American politician
- Ellen Wiener (born 1954), American artist
- Frederick Bernays Wiener (1906–1996), American jurist
- Gabriela Wiener (born 1975), Peruvian writer, chronicler, poet, and journalist
- Harry Wiener (1924–1998), American chemist
- Hermann Wiener (1857–1939), German mathematician
- Klaus Wiener (born 1962), German politician and economist
- Jacob Wiener (1815–1899), Belgian Jewish-Flemish engraver
- Jacques L. Wiener Jr. (born 1934), American judge
- Jean Wiener (1896–1982), French pianist, composer
- Joel Wiener (born 1948/49), American billionaire real estate developer and landlord
- Jonathan B. Wiener, law professor
- Jon Wiener (born 1944), American professor of history
- Josh Keaton (born Joshua Luis Wiener; born 1979), American actor, singer, and music producer
- Julien Wiener (born 1955), Australian cricketer
- L. H. Wiener (born 1945), Dutch writer
- Leigh Wiener (1929–1993), American photographer and photojournalist
- Leo Wiener (1862–1939), American historian, linguist, author, and translator of Leo Tolstoy's collected works
- Malcolm H. Wiener (born 1935), Aegean prehistorian and philanthropist
- Mark Wiener (1951–2012), American abstract painter
- Martin Wiener (born 1941), American political historian and author
- Michael A. Wiener (1938–2009), American businessman
- Murray A. Wiener (1909–?), American polar explorer and photographer
- Nina Avidar Wiener (born 1933), Israeli philanthropist
- Nina Wiener (dancer), American dancer and choreographer
- Norbert Wiener (1894–1964), American mathematician
- Otto Wiener (baritone) (1913–2000), Austrian baritone
- Otto Wiener (physicist) (1862–1927), German physicist
- Paul Lester Wiener (1895–1967), American architect and urban planner
- Phyllis Wiener (1921–2013), American painter
- Renate Chasman (born Renate Wiener; 1932–1977), American physicist
- Robert Wiener (producer), CNN producer and author of Live from Baghdad
- Rosalie Roos Wiener (1899–1982), American art student and artist
- Rosalind Wiener Wyman (1930–2022), American politician
- Scott Wiener (born 1970), American politician
- Valerie Wiener (born 1948), American politician
- Yehuda Wiener-Gafni (born 1930), Israeli basketball player
- Zvi Wiener, Israeli academic and economist

== See also ==
- Wiener (disambiguation)
- Weiner
