= Weiner =

Weiner is a surname or, in fact, the spelling of two different surnames originating in German and the closely related Yiddish language. In German, the name is pronounced [vaɪnɐ(ʁ)], of which the rare English pronunciation /vaɪnər/ is a close approximation. In Yiddish, the name is pronounced almost as in southern German (with a flapped or trilled final r).

Outside of German-speaking countries, the pronunciation of the name is influenced by the local language's pronunciation and spelling habits. The pronunciation most commonly preferred by families in English-speaking countries is /waɪnər/, but the pronunciation /wiːnər/ is also common, probably being the result of confusion and sometimes switching with the surname Wiener (meaning 'from Vienna or 'Viennese') and confusion with the fairly common pronunciation /iː/ of the letter combination "ei" in English.

The German name Weiner comes from a dialectal pronunciation of Wagner (related to the English word wagon, but only indirectly with wag[g]oner, which means "wagon driver"), which means "wainwright" (wagon maker). The source of the other name that is spelled Weiner is Yiddish, and according to dictionaries of Jewish surnames, it originates from the Yiddish name Vayner, meaning wine merchant, and related to the German word Wein, which means “wine”. Also, as noted above, there was considerable switching (in both directions) between this surname and the surname Wiener (meaning 'from Vienna or 'Viennese'). Both the Yiddish name and the German word are pronounced with the same vowel as the English word.

Weiner may refer to the following persons:

- Adam Weiner (born 1975), Polish handball goalkeeper
- Allen Weiner, former Stanford Professor of International Law
- Andrew Weiner (1949–2019), Canadian science fiction writer
- Andrew M. Weiner (born 1958), U.S. electrical engineer
- Anthony Weiner (born 1964), former U.S. politician and convicted sex offender
- Arnold M. Weiner, U.S. lawyer in Maryland
- Art Weiner (1926–2013), U.S. football player
- Ben Weiner (born 1980), U.S. contemporary artist
- Bernie Weiner (1918–2004), U.S. football player
- Bernard Weiner (born 1935), U.S. psychologist
- Charles R. Weiner (1922–2005), U.S. federal judge
- Dan Weiner (1919–1959), U.S. photojournalist
- David Weiner (disambiguation)
- Edmund Weiner (born 1950), British lexicographer
- Egon Weiner (1906–1987), sculptor and professor
- Ehud Weiner (changed name to Ehud Manor) (1941–2005), Israeli songwriter, translator, and radio and television personality
- Ellis Weiner (born 1951), U.S. author and humorist
- Eric Weiner, U.S. author and N.P.R. correspondent
- Erik Weiner (born 1977), U.S. actor, comedian, and writer
- Ernst Weiner (1913–1945), a German S.S. Hauptsturmführer during World War II
- Georg Weiner (1895-1957), German Generalmajor
- Gerry Weiner (born 1933), Canadian politician
- Greg Weiner, playgirl photographer
- Hannah Weiner (1928–1997), U.S. poet
- Hans Weiner (born 1950), German footballer
- Herbert Weiner (1919-2013), U.S. Reform rabbi
- Irving B. Weiner, U.S. psychologist
- Irwin Weiner, Chicagoan mobster
- Jacob Weiner (born Robert Milton Weiner, born 1947), plant ecologist
- Jennifer Weiner (born 1970), U.S. author and former journalist
- Jody Weiner, U.S. novelist, nonfiction author, film producer, and lawyer
- Jonathan Weiner (born 1953), U.S. popular science author
- Joshua Weiner (born 1963), U.S. poet
- Juli Weiner, American television writer and blogger
- Justus Weiner, international human rights lawyer
- Lazar Weiner (1897–1982), a Ukrainian-born, U.S. composer of Yiddish song
- László Weiner (1916–1944), Hungarian composer, pianist, and conductor
- Lawrence Weiner (1942–2021), U.S. conceptual artist
- Lee Weiner (born 1939), U.S. antiwar activist and one of the Chicago Seven
- Leo Weiner (1885–1960), Hungarian music educator
- Marc Weiner (born 1955), U.S. comedian
- Mark Weiner, professor of law
- Matthew Weiner (born 1965), U.S. screenwriter, producer and director, creator of Mad Men
- Melvin M. Weiner (December 5, 1933 - February 12, 2016) was a mechanical engineer, author, and inventor.
- Michael Weiner (actor) (born 1975), U.S. actor and composer
- Michael Weiner (professor) (born 1949), Professor at Soka University of America
- Michael Savage (born 1942), U.S. talk-show host, born Michael Alan Weiner.
- Michael Weiner (executive) (1961–2013), executive director or the Major League Baseball Players Association
- Michael Weiner (referee) (born 1969), German football referee
- Michele Weiner-Davis, M.S.W., marriage and family therapist and author
- Myron Weiner (1931–1999), U.S. political scientist
- Nina Weiner, a common misspelling for Nina Wiener, American dancer and choreographer
- Randy Weiner (born 1965), U.S. playwright, producer, and theatre/night-club owner
- Richard Weiner (Czech writer) (1884–1937), Czech journalist and writer
- Richard Weiner (American author) (1927–2014), U.S. film-maker and author
- Richard M. Weiner (born 1930), professor of theoretical physics & author
- Robert Weiner (disambiguation), multiple persons
- Ron Weiner, U.S. television writer
- Russell Weiner (born 1970), creator of the Rockstar energy drink
- Sandra Weiner (1921–2014), Polish-American street photographer and children's book author
- Steve Weiner, Canadian writer and animator
- Susan Weiner (1946–2012), politician from Georgia, U.S.
- Tim Weiner (born 1956), Pulitzer Prize-winning author
- Timon Weiner (born 1999), German footballer
- Todd Weiner (born 1975), Atlanta Falcons offensive lineman
- William Weiner (born 1955), Armenian - Israeli composer, violinist and vocalist
- Zach Weiner (born 1982), author and illustrator, web-comic cartoonist

== See also ==
- Wiener (disambiguation)
- Vainer
- Vayner
