= Robert Weiner =

Robert Weiner or Robert Wiener may refer to:

== Robert Weiner ==
- Robert S. Weiner (born 1947), American Democratic strategist and political commentator
- Robert Weiner Jr. (born 1982), American international water polo player
- Robert Weiner (American football), American high school and college football coach
- Jacob Weiner (born Robert Milton Weiner, born 1947), American plant ecologist

== Robert Wiener ==
- Robert Wiener (dentist) (1908–2019), Canadian dentist and supercentenarian
- Robert Wiener (producer), CNN producer and author of Live from Baghdad

== See also ==
- Weiner
- Weiner (disambiguation)
- Wiener (disambiguation)
