= Hot dog (disambiguation) =

A hot dog is a type of sausage, typically served in a hot dog bun.

Hot dog or hotdog may also refer to:

== Film and television ==
- Hot Dog (1930 film), an animated short
- Hot Dog…The Movie, a 1984 skiing comedy film
- Hot Dog (TV series), an NBC television series which aired 1970–1971
- Hot Dog (2018 film), a 2018 German comedy film
- Hot Dogs (film), Canadian film by Claude Fournier
- Hot Dogs (Veronica Mars), television series episode
- Hot Dog, a character from the sixth season of Battle for Dream Island, an animated web series

== Music ==
- Hotdog (band), a Filipino band
- MC HotDog (born 1978), Taiwanese rapper

=== Albums ===
- Hot Dog (Lou Donaldson album), or the title song, 1969
- Hot Dog! (Buck Owens album), or the 1956 title song (see below), 1988
- Take One! (Shakin' Stevens album), 1980; re-released as Hot Dog, 1982
- Hotdog, a 2008 album by Ron Contour (an alias of Moka Only)

=== Songs ===
- "Hot Dog" (song), released by Buck Owens recording as Corky Jones, 1956; covered by Shakin Stevens, 1980
- "Hot Dog", by the Archies from Everything's Archie, 1969
- "Hot Dog", by Elvis Presley from the Loving You film soundtrack, 1957
- "Hot Dog", by Eugenius from Oomalama, 1992
- "Hot Dog", by Led Zeppelin from In Through the Out Door, 1979
- "Hot Dog", by Limp Bizkit from Chocolate Starfish and the Hot Dog Flavored Water, 2000
- "Hot Dog", by LMFAO from Sorry for Party Rocking, 2011
- "Hot Dog", by the New Mastersounds, 2001
- "Hot Dog", by Ranking Stone from Censurado, 2003
- "Hotdog", by Simian Mobile Disco from Attack Decay Sustain Release, 2007
- "Hot Dog", by Tea Leaf Green, 2001
- "Hot Dog!", by They Might Be Giants; the closing theme for the TV show Mickey Mouse Clubhouse, 2006
- "Hot Dog (I Love You So)", by the Delfonics from Sound of Sexy Soul, 1969
- "Hot Dog (Watch Me Eat)", by the Detroit Cobras from Baby, 2004

== Sports ==
- Freestyle skiing, sometimes called "hot-dogging"
- Tweener (tennis), sometimes called a "hot dog"

== Other uses ==
- HotDog domain, a protein structural motif found in some enzymes
- HotDog (software), an HTML editor
- Hotdog (magazine), a UK film magazine
- Hot Dog, comic book character in Jughead Jones
- Corn dog, known in New Zealand and South Korea as a hot dog
- "Hot DOG", in astronomy, a hot, dust-obscured galaxy

== See also ==
- Wiener (disambiguation)
- Weenie (disambiguation)
- Jotdog, a Mexican band
