= Richard Weiner =

Richard Weiner is the name of:

- Richard Weiner (Czech writer) (1884–1937), Czech writer
- Richard Weiner (American author) (1927–2014), American writer
- Richard M. Weiner (born 1930), Romanian theoretical physics professor

== See also ==
- Weiner (surname)
