= Mettmann I =

Federal electoral district of Germany

103 Mettmann I
- Electoral district for the Bundestag
- Mettmann I in 2025
- State: North Rhine-Westphalia
- Population: 268,900 (2019)
- Electorate: 203,030 (2021)
- Major settlements: Langenfeld; Hilden; Erkrath
- Area: 183.8 km^{2}

Current electoral district
- Created: 1949
- Party: CDU
- Member: Klaus Wiener
- Elected: 2021, 2025

Mettmann I is an electoral constituency (German: Wahlkreis) represented in the Bundestag. It elects one member via first-past-the-post voting. Under the current constituency numbering system, it is designated as constituency 103. It is located in western North Rhine-Westphalia, comprising the southern part of the district of Mettmann.

Mettmann I was created for the inaugural 1949 federal election. Since 2021, it has been represented by Klaus Wiener of the Christian Democratic Union (CDU).

== Geography ==
Mettmann I is located in western North Rhine-Westphalia. As of the 2021 federal election, it comprises the municipalities of Erkrath, Haan, Hilden, Langenfeld, Mettmann, and Monheim am Rhein from the district of Mettmann.

== History ==
Mettmann I was created in 1949, then known as Düsseldorf-Mettmann. From 1965 through 1976, it was named Düsseldorf-Mettmann II. It acquired its current name in the 1980 election. In the 1949 election, it was North Rhine-Westphalia constituency 18 in the numbering system. From 1953 through 1961, it was number 77. From 1965 through 1980, it was number 73. From 1980 through 1998, it was number 72. From 2002 through 2009, it was number 105. In the 2013 through 2021 elections, it was number 104. From the 2025 election, it has been number 103.

Originally, the constituency was coterminous with the district of Düsseldorf-Mettmann. In the 1965 through 1976 elections, it comprised the southern parts of the district, specifically the municipalities of Erkrath, Haan, Mettmann, Hilden, and Wülfrath. It acquired its current borders in the 1980 election.

Election	No.	Name	Borders
1949	18	Düsseldorf-Mettmann	Düsseldorf-Mettmann district
1953	77	Düsseldorf-Mettmann	Düsseldorf-Mettmann district
1957	77	Düsseldorf-Mettmann	Düsseldorf-Mettmann district
1961	77	Düsseldorf-Mettmann	Düsseldorf-Mettmann district
1965	73	Düsseldorf-Mettmann I	Düsseldorf-Mettmann district (only Erkrath, Haan, Mettmann, Hilden, and Wülfrath municipalities)
1969	73	Düsseldorf-Mettmann I	Düsseldorf-Mettmann district (only Erkrath, Haan, Mettmann, Hilden, and Wülfrath municipalities)
1972	73	Düsseldorf-Mettmann I	Düsseldorf-Mettmann district (only Erkrath, Haan, Mettmann, Hilden, and Wülfrath municipalities)
1976	73	Düsseldorf-Mettmann I	Düsseldorf-Mettmann district (only Erkrath, Haan, Mettmann, Hilden, and Wülfrath municipalities)
1980	72	Mettmann I	Mettmann district (only Erkrath, Haan, Hilden, Langenfeld, Mettmann, and Monheim am Rhein municipalities)
1983	72	Mettmann I	Mettmann district (only Erkrath, Haan, Hilden, Langenfeld, Mettmann, and Monheim am Rhein municipalities)
1987	72	Mettmann I	Mettmann district (only Erkrath, Haan, Hilden, Langenfeld, Mettmann, and Monheim am Rhein municipalities)
1990	72	Mettmann I	Mettmann district (only Erkrath, Haan, Hilden, Langenfeld, Mettmann, and Monheim am Rhein municipalities)
1994	72	Mettmann I	Mettmann district (only Erkrath, Haan, Hilden, Langenfeld, Mettmann, and Monheim am Rhein municipalities)
1998	72	Mettmann I	Mettmann district (only Erkrath, Haan, Hilden, Langenfeld, Mettmann, and Monheim am Rhein municipalities)
2002	105	Mettmann I	Mettmann district (only Erkrath, Haan, Hilden, Langenfeld, Mettmann, and Monheim am Rhein municipalities)
2005	105	Mettmann I	Mettmann district (only Erkrath, Haan, Hilden, Langenfeld, Mettmann, and Monheim am Rhein municipalities)
2009	105	Mettmann I	Mettmann district (only Erkrath, Haan, Hilden, Langenfeld, Mettmann, and Monheim am Rhein municipalities)
2013	104	Mettmann I	Mettmann district (only Erkrath, Haan, Hilden, Langenfeld, Mettmann, and Monheim am Rhein municipalities)
2017	104	Mettmann I	Mettmann district (only Erkrath, Haan, Hilden, Langenfeld, Mettmann, and Monheim am Rhein municipalities)
2021	104	Mettmann I	Mettmann district (only Erkrath, Haan, Hilden, Langenfeld, Mettmann, and Monheim am Rhein municipalities)
2025	103	Mettmann I	Mettmann district (only Erkrath, Haan, Hilden, Langenfeld, Mettmann, and Monheim am Rhein municipalities)

== Members ==
The constituency was first represented by Gerhard Schröder of the Christian Democratic Union (CDU) from 1949 to 1969. He was succeeded by Georg Neemann in 1969, who served a single term before the Social Democratic Party (SPD)'s candidate Uwe Holtz was elected in 1972. He served until 1983, when Joseph-Theodor Blank of the CDU won it. Lilo Friedrich was elected in 1998 and 2002, before Michaela Noll of the CDU became representative in 2005. She was re-elected in 2009, 2013, and 2017. She was succeeded by Klaus Wiener in 2021. He was re-elected in 2025.

Election	Member	Party	%
1949	Gerhard Schröder	CDU	34.1
1953	Gerhard Schröder	CDU	52.0
1957	Gerhard Schröder	CDU	54.2
1961	Gerhard Schröder	CDU	44.9
1965	Gerhard Schröder	CDU	48.6
1969	Georg Neemann	CDU	47.9
1972	Uwe Holtz	SPD	53.5
1976	Uwe Holtz	SPD	48.5
1980	Uwe Holtz	SPD	49.4
1983	Joseph-Theodor Blank	CDU	49.1
1987	Joseph-Theodor Blank	CDU	46.0
1990	Joseph-Theodor Blank	CDU	44.1
1994	Joseph-Theodor Blank	CDU	45.8
1998	Lilo Friedrich	SPD	46.0
2002	Lilo Friedrich	SPD	42.8
2005	Michaela Noll	CDU	47.3
2009	Michaela Noll	CDU	44.9
2013	Michaela Noll	CDU	49.5
2017	Michaela Noll	CDU	44.6
2021	Klaus Wiener	CDU	30.0
2025	Klaus Wiener	CDU	36.6

== Election results ==
=== 2025 election ===
Federal election (2025): Mettmann I
Notes:	Blue background denotes the winner of the electorate vote. Pink background denotes a candidate elected from their party list. Yellow background denotes an electorate win by a list member, or other incumbent. A ✓ or ✗ denotes status of any incumbent, win or lose respectively.						
Party	Candidate	Votes	%	±%	Party votes	%	±%
CDU	✓ Klaus Wiener	60,813	36.6	▲6.6	53,516	32.1	▲4.7
SPD	Pat Kreß	37,459	22.5	▼2.4	31,482	18.9	▼7.9
AfD	Martin Renner	26,187	15.8	▲9.0	25,921	15.5	▲8.8
Greens	Dirk Miemeyer	20,705	12.5	▼10.4	21,284	12.8	▼3.3
Left	Klaus Wockenforth	10,713	6.4	▲3.8	11,506	6.9	▲3.8
FDP	Yannick Hope	7,482	4.5	▼4.9	9,419	5.7	▼7.7
BSW					6,983	4.2	
Volt	Michael Gerzmann	2,863	1.7		1,401	0.8	▲0.5
Tierschutzpartei					2,259	1.4	▼0.1
PARTEI					825	0.5	▼0.4
FW				▼1.2	680	0.4	▼0.3
PdF					350	0.2	▲
dieBasis				▼1.2	340	0.2	▼0.8
Team Todenhöfer					338	0.2	▼0.6
BD					188	0.1	
Values					117	0.1	
MERA25					57	0.0	
MLPD					38	0.0	0.0
Pirates							▼0.4
Gesundheitsforschung							▼0.1
ÖDP							▼0.1
Bündnis C							▼0.1
Humanists							▼0.1
SGP						0.0	0.0
Informal votes		1,365			883		
Total valid votes		166,222			166,704		
Turnout		167,587	83.4	▲4.9			
CDU hold	Majority	23,354	14.1				

=== 2021 election ===
Federal election (2021): Mettmann I
Notes:	Blue background denotes the winner of the electorate vote. Pink background denotes a candidate elected from their party list. Yellow background denotes an electorate win by a list member, or other incumbent. A ✓ or ✗ denotes status of any incumbent, win or lose respectively.						
Party	Candidate	Votes	%	±%	Party votes	%	±%
CDU	Klaus Wiener	47,326	30.0	▼14.7	43,354	27.4	▼6.6
SPD	Christian Steinacker	39,326	24.9	▼0.8	42,385	26.8	▲3.8
Greens	Roland Schüren	36,095	22.9	▲15.9	25,430	16.1	▲8.7
FDP	Nicole Burda	14,873	9.4	▲1.1	21,083	13.3	▼2.9
AfD	Martin Renner	10,704	6.8	▼2.1	10,658	6.7	▼2.7
Left	Lutz Gallasch	4,252	2.7	▼2.8	4,956	3.1	▼3.3
Tierschutzpartei					2,260	1.4	▲0.6
dieBasis	Marc Gutknecht	1,845	1.2		1,632	1.0	
PARTEI					1,474	0.9	▲0.3
Team Todenhöfer					1,321	0.8	
FW	Mathias Huning	1,818	1.2		1,117	0.7	▲0.5
Independent	Thorsten Klimczak	896	0.6				
Independent	Bernd Herrmann	761	0.5				
Pirates					652	0.4	0.0
Volt					571	0.4	
LIEBE					215	0.1	
Gesundheitsforschung					208	0.1	0.0
LfK					195	0.1	
NPD					130	0.1	▼0.1
V-Partei3					119	0.1	0.0
ÖDP					104	0.1	0.0
Bündnis C					98	0.1	
Humanists					94	0.1	0.0
PdF					77	0.0	
du.					72	0.0	
LKR					46	0.0	
MLPD					22	0.0	0.0
DKP					21	0.0	0.0
SGP					14	0.0	0.0
Informal votes		1,561			1,149		
Total valid votes		157,896			158,308		
Turnout		159,457	78.5	▲0.4			
CDU hold	Majority	8,000	5.1	▼13.9			

=== 2017 election ===
Federal election (2017): Mettmann I
Notes:	Blue background denotes the winner of the electorate vote. Pink background denotes a candidate elected from their party list. Yellow background denotes an electorate win by a list member, or other incumbent. A ✓ or ✗ denotes status of any incumbent, win or lose respectively.						
Party	Candidate	Votes	%	±%	Party votes	%	±%
CDU	✓ Michaela Noll	70,762	44.6	▼4.9	54,126	34.0	▼9.0
SPD	Jens Niklaus	40,819	25.7	▼8.9	36,596	23.0	▼5.2
AfD	Martin Renner	14,106	8.9	▲5.8	15,053	9.5	▲4.4
FDP	Martina Reuter	13,202	8.3	▲6.4	25,757	16.2	▲9.9
Greens	Jörn Leunert	11,014	6.9	▲1.9	11,796	7.4	▼0.2
Left	Dieter Karzig	8,647	5.5	▲1.7	10,216	6.4	▲1.3
Tierschutzpartei					1,294	0.8	
PARTEI					1,071	0.7	▲0.4
Pirates					707	0.4	▼1.7
AD-DEMOKRATEN					571	0.4	
FW					344	0.2	0.0
NPD					266	0.2	▼0.7
V-Partei³					181	0.1	
DiB					178	0.1	
ÖDP					176	0.1	0.0
DM					167	0.1	
Gesundheitsforschung					158	0.1	
Volksabstimmung					156	0.1	▼0.1
BGE					147	0.1	
Die Humanisten					107	0.1	
MLPD					59	0.0	0.0
DKP					22	0.0	
SGP					17	0.0	0.0
Informal votes		1,765			1,150		
Total valid votes		158,550			159,165		
Turnout		160,315	78.1	▲3.0			
CDU hold	Majority	29,943	18.9	▲4.0			

=== 2013 election ===
Federal election (2013): Mettmann I
Notes:	Blue background denotes the winner of the electorate vote. Pink background denotes a candidate elected from their party list. Yellow background denotes an electorate win by a list member, or other incumbent. A ✓ or ✗ denotes status of any incumbent, win or lose respectively.						
Party	Candidate	Votes	%	±%	Party votes	%	±%
CDU	✓ Michaela Noll	75,628	49.5	▲5.0	65,696	43.0	▲8.1
SPD	Peer Steinbrück	52,832	34.6	▲0.8	43,173	28.2	▲3.6
Greens	Ophelia-Johanna Nick	7,735	5.1	▼2.1	11,699	7.7	▼2.7
Left	Rainer Köster	5,697	3.7	▼1.9	7,808	5.1	▼1.9
AfD	Gottfried Helmut Ottweiler	4,683	3.1		7,764	5.1	
Pirates	Andreas Graaf	3,134	2.1		3,243	2.1	▲0.5
FDP	Moritz Körner	2,964	1.9	▼5.9	9,660	6.3	▼11.8
NPD					1,273	0.8	0.0
PARTEI					457	0.3	
PRO					328	0.2	
FW					305	0.2	
REP					283	0.2	▼0.2
Volksabstimmung					273	0.2	▲0.1
ÖDP					229	0.1	▲0.1
Nichtwahler					199	0.1	
BIG					148	0.1	
Party of Reason					101	0.1	
RRP					96	0.1	▼0.1
Die Rechte					47	0.0	
BüSo					45	0.0	0.0
PSG					30	0.0	0.0
MLPD					26	0.0	0.0
Informal votes		1,800			1,590		
Total valid votes		152,673			152,883		
Turnout		154,473	75.1	▲1.4			
CDU hold	Majority	22,796	14.9	▲4.2			

=== 2009 election ===
Federal election (2009): Mettmann I
Notes:	Blue background denotes the winner of the electorate vote. Pink background denotes a candidate elected from their party list. Yellow background denotes an electorate win by a list member, or other incumbent. A ✓ or ✗ denotes status of any incumbent, win or lose respectively.						
Party	Candidate	Votes	%	±%	Party votes	%	±%
CDU	✓ Michaela Noll	66,300	44.5	▼2.8	52,053	34.9	▼2.8
SPD	Peer Steinbrück	50,319	33.8	▼5.9	36,767	24.7	▼11.1
FDP	Michael Ruppert	11,674	7.8	▲3.6	27,081	18.2	▲5.8
Greens	Peter Knitsch	10,611	7.1	▲2.8	15,404	10.3	▲3.4
Left	Bastian Immanuel Wefes	8,412	5.6	▲2.1	10,411	7.0	▲2.6
Pirates					2,401	1.6	
NPD	Ralf-Peter Zecher	1,690	1.1	▲0.2	1,218	0.8	▲0.1
Tierschutzpartei					960	0.6	▲0.2
FAMILIE					785	0.5	▲0.1
REP					628	0.4	▼0.1
RENTNER					596	0.4	
RRP					257	0.2	
Volksabstimmung					164	0.1	0.0
ÖDP					123	0.1	
Centre					84	0.1	0.0
DVU					69	0.0	
BüSo					48	0.0	0.0
MLPD					32	0.0	0.0
PSG					21	0.0	0.0
Informal votes		1,709			1,613		
Total valid votes		149,006			149,102		
Turnout		150,715	73.7	▼6.6			
CDU hold	Majority	15,981	10.7	▲3.1			

=== 2005 election ===
Federal election (2005): Mettmann I
Notes:	Blue background denotes the winner of the electorate vote. Pink background denotes a candidate elected from their party list. Yellow background denotes an electorate win by a list member, or other incumbent. A ✓ or ✗ denotes status of any incumbent, win or lose respectively.						
Party	Candidate	Votes	%	±%	Party votes	%	±%
CDU	Michaela Noll	77,187	47.3	▲5.1	61,598	37.7	▲0.3
SPD	✗ Lilo Friedrich	64,699	39.7	▼3.1	58,511	35.8	▼3.5
Greens	Peter Knitsch	7,034	4.3	▼1.4	11,398	7.0	▼1.6
Free Democratic Party (Germany	Dirk Wedel	6,879	4.2	▼3.1	20,143	12.3	▲1.1
Left	Peter Peters	5,753	3.5	▲2.6	7,178	4.4	▲3.3
NPD	Marco Meiniger	1,520	0.9		1,183	0.7	▲0.4
GRAUEN					945	0.6	▲0.3
Tierschutzpartei					761	0.5	▲0.1
Familie					667	0.4	▲0.2
REP					545	0.3	
From Now on... Democracy Through Referendum					131	0.1	
BüSo					79	0.0	
MLPD					52	0.0	
PBC					211	0.1	
Centre					40	0.0	
Socialist Equality Party					49	0.0	0.0
Informal votes		2,105			1,686		
Total valid votes		163,072			163,491		
Turnout		165,177	80.3	▼2.2			
CDU gain from SPD	Majority	12,488	7.6				
