= Michaela Noll =

German politician (born 1959)

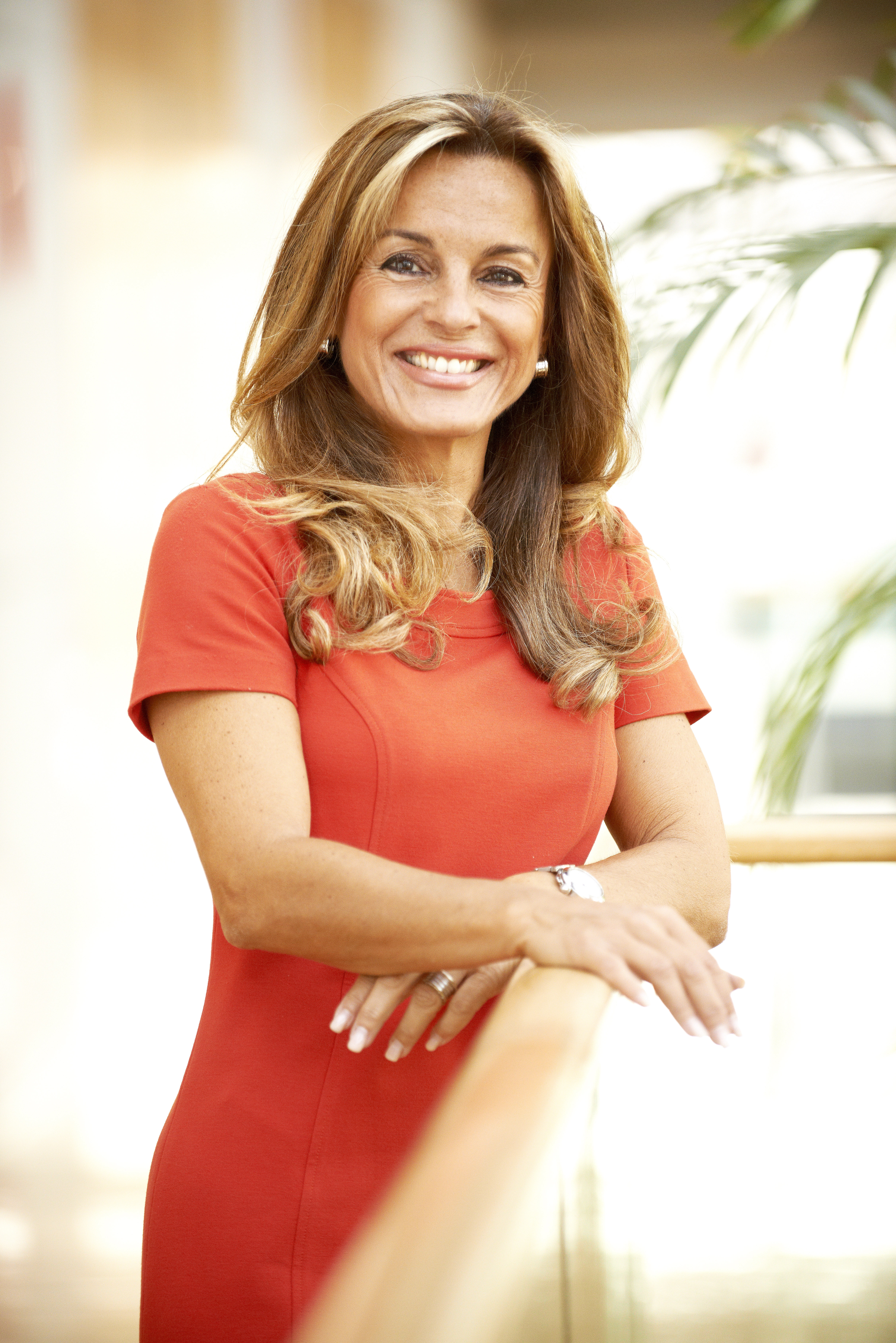
- Noll in 2012

Member of the Bundestag
- In office 2002–2021
- Preceded by: Lilo Friedrich (2005)
- Succeeded by: Klaus Wiener
- Constituency: NRW state list (2002–2005); Mettmann I (2005–2021)

Personal details
- Born: Michaela Marion Tadjadod; 24 December 1959 (age 66) Düsseldorf, West Germany (now Germany)
- Party: Christian Democratic
- Children: 1
- Education: University of Cologne; Goethe University Frankfurt

Michaela Marion Noll (née Tadjadod; born 24 December 1959) is a German lawyer and politician of the Christian Democratic Union (CDU) who served as a member of the Bundestag from the state of North Rhine-Westphalia from 2002 until 2021.

== Early life ==
Michaela Marion Tadjadod was born as the daughter of a German mother and Iranian banker Mostafa Tadjadod, who founded Bazargani Bank and served in the government of Mohammad Reza Pahlavi as his economy minister; later he fled Iran. She grew up with her grandparents in a soldiers' household in the Rhineland.

== Early career ==
After graduating from Mataré-Gymnasium, Meerbusch in 1980, Tadjadod spent a year in the United States for language immersion then she trained as an interpreter for English, French and Spanish from 1981 to 1982, when she began studying law at the University of Cologne and at Johann Wolfgang Goethe University in Frankfurt. In 1987 she passed her first state bar examination and in December 1991 her second. After two years on parental leave, from 1994 to 2002 she was a consultant for the women's union of the CDU-NRW in Düsseldorf and in 2001 she was admitted to the bar.

== Political career ==
Noll first became a member of the Bundestag after the 2002 German federal election. She was a member of the Committee for Family, Senior Citizens, Women and Youth from 2002 until 2013 and again from 2018 until 2021. From 2014 until 2017, she served on the Defence Committee.

In addition to her committee assignments, Noll was part of the German-French Parliamentary Friendship Group, the German-Swiss Parliamentary Friendship Group and the German Parliamentary Friendship Group with Australia and New Zealand. She was also a member of the German delegation to the Parliamentary Assembly of the Organization for Security and Co-operation in Europe (OSCE).

In late 2019, Noll announced that she would not stand in the 2021 federal elections but instead resign from active politics by the end of the parliamentary term.

== Other activities ==
- German Foundation for Peace Research (DSF), Member of the Board (since 2018)

== Political positions ==
In June 2017, Noll voted against Germany's introduction of same-sex marriage.

== Personal life ==
As Michaela Tadjadod, she gave birth to a son in 1991 from her prior marriage to an attorney. She married again in 2002 and took the surname Noll shortly after her election to the Bundestag. Noll is Roman Catholic.
