= David Weiner =

David Weiner may refer to:

- David Weiner (editor), editor at the Huffington Post
- David A. Weiner, American filmmaker, magazine editor, and journalist
- David B. Weiner, American biomedical researcher
- Dave Weiner (born 1976), American musician
