= List of Kaguya-sama: Love Is War chapters =

Kaguya-sama: Love Is War is a Japanese manga series written and illustrated by Aka Akasaka. Akasaka launched the series in the June issue of Shueisha's seinen manga magazine Miracle Jump on May 19, 2015. The series switched to the publisher's Weekly Young Jump magazine on March 24, 2016. A special chapter ran in the debut issue of Young Jump Gold on May 18, 2017. North American publisher Viz Media announced their license to the series during their panel at San Diego Comic-Con on July 20, 2017.

A spinoff manga by Shinta Sakayama, titled Kaguya-sama wa Kokurasetai: Dōjin-ban (かぐや様は告らせたい 同人版; transl. "Kaguya Wants to be Confessed to – Dōjin Edition"), launched on Shueisha's Tonari no Young Jump website on June 14, 2018, and is serialized on the second and fourth Thursdays of the month. A yonkoma spinoff, written by G3 Ida and titled Kaguya-sama o Kataritai (かぐや様を語りたい; transl. We Want to Talk About Kaguya), launched in Young Jump on July 26, 2018. The yonkoma focuses on two newspaper/press club girls who idolize Kaguya and the gang but have no clue what really goes on inside the student council.

Individual chapters of the series are called battles.

== Volumes ==
No.	Original release date	Original ISBN	English release date	English ISBN
1	March 18, 2016	978-4-08-890432-0	March 6, 2018	978-1-9747-0030-1
1. I Want to be Invited to a Movie (映画に誘わせたい, Eiga ni Sasowasetai); 2. I Want to Play Old Maid (ババ抜きをさせたい, Babanuki o Sasetai); 3. Kaguya Doesn't Know Much (かぐや様はよく知らない, Kaguya-sama wa Yoku Shiranai); 4. Miyuki Shirogane Wants to Answer (白銀御行は答えたい, Shirogane Miyuki wa Kotaetai); 5. Kaguya Wants to Eat (かぐや様はいただきたい, Kaguya-sama wa Itadakitai); 6. Miyuki Shirogane Wants to Hide (白銀御行は隠したい, Shirogane Miyuki wa Kakushitai); 7. Fujiwara Wants to Go On a Trip (藤原ちゃんは出かけたい, Fujiwara-chan wa Dekaketai); 8. Kaguya Wants to be Answered (かぐや様は当てられたい, Kaguya-sama wa Ateraretai); 9. Kaguya Wants to Walk (かぐや様は歩きたい, Kaguya-sama wa Arukitai); 10. The Student Council Wants to Play a Prank (生徒会は悪戯したい, Seitokai wa Itazura Shitai)
Chika gives a pair of movie tickets to Miyuki but he tries to set up his invitation to Kaguya so as to not make it a love confession. Kaguya, who had planted the tickets, tries to use her acting emotions to sway Miyuki. Kaguya and Miyuki agree to play a game of old maid where the winner gets to command the loser to do something. Miyuki wins, and takes one of the movie tickets, saying Kaguya can do whatever she wants with the other one. They show up at the theater at the same time, but Kaguya hesitates on picking a seat next to Miyuki without telling him she wants to sit next to him. Later, Chika shares some word/phrase puzzles with Kaguya. Miyuki cannot help but listen in, but struggles to solve them. When Miyuki brings his homemade lunch and shares some with Chika, Kaguya glares angrily at the two. A boy asks Miyuki for love advice while Kaguya listens in. Chika wants to go on a summer trip for the student council; Miyuki and Kaguya debate whether to go to the mountains or the ocean. Kaguya challenges Miyuki to a game of 20 questions to see if he knows what she likes. Kaguya has to walk to school. While Miyuki is napping at his desk, Kaguya tries to influence his REM sleep, but Chika arrives and plays a prank.
2	July 19, 2016	978-4-08-890468-9	May 1, 2018	978-1-9747-0031-8
11. Kaguya Wants to Exchange (かぐや様は交換したい, Kaguya-sama wa Koukan Shitai); 12. Kaguya Wants to be Stopped (かぐや様は止められたい, Kaguya-sama wa Tomeraretai); 13. Kaguya Wants to be Indirect (かぐや様は口付けたい, Kaguya-sama wa Kuchi Tsuketai); 14. Miyuki Shirogane Hasn't Done It (白銀御行はまだしてない, Shirogane Miyuki wa Mada Shitenai); 15. Miyuki Shirogane Wants to Flee (白銀御行は逃げ出したい, Shirogane Miyuki wa Nigedashitai); 16. Kaguya Wants to Do Well (かぐや様はこなしたい, Kaguya-sama wa Konashitai); 17. Kaguya Wants to Adore (かぐや様は愛でたい, Kaguya-sama wa Medetai); 18. The Student Council Wants to Talk (生徒会は言わせたい, Seitokai wa Iwasetai); 19. Kaguya Wants to be Sent (かぐや様は送らせたい, Kaguya-sama wa Okurasetai); 20. Miyuki Shirogane Wants to Speak (白銀御行は話したい, Shirogane Miyuki wa Hanashitai)
Miyuki tries to get Kaguya to ask him for his LINE ID on his new smartphone, while Kaguya, who had secretly arranged the circumstances, does the same. When Kaguya gets a love letter, Miyuki tries to stop her from going without confessing. While having coffee, the cups accidentally get switched, causing Miyuki to struggle with the implications of an indirect kiss. When Chika and Miyuki read a women's magazine article about teens doing it, Kaguya thinks it is not a big deal, misunderstanding the euphemism. While organizing some boxes, Miyuki is paralyzed by a cockroach, while Kaguya tries to use the opportunity to act scared in order to get closer to Miyuki. A girl (Nagisa Kashiwagi) asks Kaguya for advice on whether she should break up with her boyfriend, when Chika intervenes with her own plans. When Chika gives cat ears to Kaguya and Miyuki, the latter two become really shy because of the cuteness of each other's appearances. The council plays the forbidden word game. Kaguya hesitates about texting Miyuki, so her assistant Ai Hayasaka has her call him instead. At the event with the French high school student council, Miyuki discovers he is the least fluent of the Japanese student council members in French, so he tries hard to pretend to know what is going on.
3	October 19, 2016	978-4-08-890508-2	July 3, 2018	978-1-9747-0032-5
21. Kaguya Wants to Have Held (かぐや様は差されたい, Kaguya-sama wa Sasaretai); 22. Chika Fujiwara Wants to Be Eaten (藤原千花は食べられたい, Fujiwara Chika wa Taberaretai); 23. Miyuki Shirogane Wants to Show Off (白銀御行は見せつけたい, Shirogane Miyuki wa Misetsuketai); 24. Yu Ishigami Wants to Survive (石上優は生き延びたい, Ishigami Yū wa Ikinobitai); 25. Kaguya Wants to Be Noticed (かぐや様は気づかれたい, Kaguya-sama wa Kizukaretai); 26. Miyuki Shirogane Wants to Work (白銀御行は働きたい, Shirogane Miyuki wa Hatarakitai); 27. Kaguya Wants to Endure (かぐや様は堪えたい, Kaguya-sama wa Taetai); 28. Kaguya Wants to be Joined (かぐや様は入れたい, Kaguya-sama wa Iretai); 29. Ai Hayasaka Wants to Defend (早坂愛は防ぎたい, Hayasaka Ai wa Fusegitai); 30. Miyuki Shirogane Can't Lose (白銀御行は負けられない, Shirogane Miyuki wa Makerarenai)
Kaguya and Miyuki try to get each other to ask to share an umbrella. Chika and Kaguya read a shojo manga comic that has some racy scenes. When Miyuki realizes he can't play volleyball to support a school club, Chika coaches him. Treasurer Yu Ishigami wants to quit the student council because he is afraid that Kaguya will kill him. Ai does Kaguya's nails so Kaguya can get Miyuki to notice. Kashiwagi's boyfriend asks for Miyuki advice on holding hands, Chika (along with Kaguya) intervenes again. Chika discovers that Kaguya can't stop laughing when the word "wiener" is mentioned. Yu talks with Miyuki about balancing the books and whether to raise club fees. Ai alters Miyuki's coffee so that he falls asleep next to Kaguya, and tries to distract Chika and the others from entering the student council room. The student council prepares for semester final exams.
4	January 19, 2017	978-4-08-890572-3	September 4, 2018	978-1-9747-0049-3
31. Chika Fujiwara Wants to Test (藤原千花はテストしたい, Fujiwara Chika wa Tesuto Shitai); 32. Kaguya Wants To Be Hated (かぐや様は嫌われたい, Kaguya-sama wa Kirawaretai); 33. Miyuki Shirogane Wants to Sing (白銀御行は歌いたい, Shirogane Miyuki wa Utaitai); 34. Kaguya Wants To Take Him Home (かぐや様は送りたい, Kaguya-sama wa Okuritai); 35. Chika Fujiwara Wants to Visit (藤原書記は見舞いたい, Fujiwara Shoki wa Mimaitai); 36. Regarding Kaguya Shinomiya, Part 1 (四宮かぐやについて①, Shinomiya Kaguya ni Tsuite Ichi); 37. Kaguya Won't Relent (かぐや様は許せない, Kaguya-sama wa Yurusenai); 38. Kaguya Wants to Forgive (かぐや様は許したい, Kaguya-sama wa Yurushitai); 39. Kaguya Wants to be Called (かぐや様は呼ばせたい, Kaguya-sama wa Yobasetai); 40. Miyuki Shirogane Wants to Go on a Trip (白銀御行は出かけたい, Shirogane Miyuki wa Dekaketai)
When Chika shares situational questions from a love psychology book, Kaguya, who has secretly read it, tries to give the perfect answer. Miyuki tries to use some social interaction strategies found from a magazine insert with Kaguya, not knowing that Kaguya has already memorized them. When Chika realizes Miyuki has been lip syncing the school anthem, she end up putting Miyuki through her training. When a rain storm causes the trains to shut down, Kaguya ponders how to have Miyuki get a ride with her. When Kaguya is at home sick, Chika and Miyuki play a game of concentration to see who will go visit her. Miyuki wins and visits, but somehow end up asleep in the same bed. Kaguya and Miyuki also struggle over who should eat the last piece of cake at the student council room. Kaguya shares her "I have this friend" situation with Nagisa, while Miyuki does the same with Yu. When Miyuki's younger sister visits the council room, Kaguya wants to develop a close friendship with her. Chika suggests the student council go on a trip together for summer break.
5	April 19, 2017	978-4-08-890623-2	November 6, 2018	978-1-9747-0050-9
41. Miyuki Shirogane Wants to Meet (白銀御行は出会いたい, Shirogane Miyuki wa Deaitai); 42. Ai Hayasaka Wants to Soak (早坂愛は浸かりたい, Hayasaka Ai wa Tsukaritai); 43. Chika Fujiwara Really Wants to Eat (藤原千花は超食べたい, Fujiwara Chika wa Chō Tabetai); 44. I Can't Hear the Fireworks, Part 1 (花火の音は聞こえない 前編, Hanabi no Oto wa Kikoenai – Zenpen); 45. I Can't Hear the Fireworks, Part 2 (花火の音は聞こえない 後編, Hanabi no Oto wa Kikoenai – Kouhen); 46. Kaguya Doesn't Want to Avoid (かぐや様は避けたくない, Kaguya-sama wa Saketakunai); 47. Kaguya Wants Him to Choose (かぐや様は選ばせたい, Kaguya-sama wa Erabasetai); 48. The Student Council Isn't Alpha (生徒会は神ってない, Seitokai wa Kamittenai); 49. Miyuki Shirogane Wants to Prepare (白銀御行は捌きたい, Shirogane Miyuki wa Sabakitai); 50. Kaguya Wants to Celebrate (かぐや様は祝いたい, Kaguya-sama wa Iwaitai)
A half month into summer break, Kaguya and Miyuki have still not contacted each other; they visit the student council room but miss each other by minutes. Kaguya interrupts Ai's bath time in order to ask her how to use Twitter. Chika impresses a ramen foodie. Kaguya misses shopping time because she was summoned to meet her father, and is later prohibited from attending the summer festival that has fireworks. She escapes from the estate, but misses the fireworks show, that is, until Miyuki finds her and they manage to see fireworks from another event. When Miyuki and Kaguya get embarrassed over their interactions, they act like passing airplanes in the council room. Miyuki tries to guess which elective class Kaguya will choose. Nagisa's boyfriend visits Miyuki but it appears to be more like bragging about his relationship. Chika puts Miyuki through her training so he can gut and fillet a fish. Kaguya wants to celebrate Miyuki's upcoming birthday but tries to have the student council bring up the subject first.
6	July 19, 2017	978-4-08-890702-4	January 1, 2019	978-1-9747-0138-4
51. Nagisa Kashiwagi Can't Watch (柏木渚は見てられない, Kashiwagi Nagisa wa Miterarenai); 52. Kaguya Wants to Ask (かぐや様は聞き出したい, Kaguya-sama wa Kikidashitai); 53. Kaguya Wants to Give (かぐや様は贈りたい, Kaguya-sama wa Okuritai); 54. Chika Fujiwara Wants to Confirm (藤原千花は確かめたい, Fujiwara Chika wa Tashikametai); 55. Thus, Yu Ishigami Closed His Eyes, Part 1 (そして、石上優は目を閉じた①, Soshite, Ishigami Yū wa Me o Tojita Ichi); 56. Miyuki Shirogane Wants to Gaze (白銀御行は見上げたい, Shirogane Miyuki wa Miagetai); 57. Kaguya Wants to Marry (かぐや様は結婚したい, Kaguya-sama wa Kekkon Shitai); 58. Ai Hayasaka Wants to Seduce (早坂愛はオトしたい, Hayasaka Ai wa Otoshitai); 59. The 67th Student Council (第67期生徒会, Dai Rokujūnana-ki Seitokai); 60. Kaguya Doesn't Want to Call (かぐや様は呼びたくない, Kaguya-sama wa Yobitakunai)
Nagisa observes the romantic interactions between Kaguya and Miyuki. During window shopping with Chika and Moeha, Kaguya tries to get closer to Kei. Kaguya buys an elaborate cake for Miyuki's birthday but debates in her head what to do about it. Miyuki ponders the implications of Kaguya's celebrating his birthday exclusively with him. Kaguya tutors Yu so he can pass his exams. When the student council go moon gazing, Kaguya tries to get her and Miyuki alone, but Miyuki surprises her with his knowledge of the stars and The Tale of the Bamboo Cutter story. The student council play a custom-made game from Chika's board game club. Kaguya dares Ai to try to get Miyuki to fall for her. The student council think back on their activities as they disband for the term. Kaguya ponders how to address Miyuki with honorifics until Miyuki tells her he is going to run again for student council president.
7	October 19, 2017	978-4-08-890762-8	March 5, 2019	978-1-9747-0139-1
61. Kaguya Wants a Confession (かぐや様は告ら"れ"たい, Kaguya-sama wa Kokura"re"tai); 62. Miyuki Shirogane Wants to Draw (白銀御行は描きたい, Shirogane Miyuki wa Kakitai); 63. Miyuki Shirogane Wants to Be Popular (白銀御行はモテたい, Shirogane Miyuki wa Motetai); 64. Nagisa Kashiwagi Wants to Console (柏木渚は慰めたい, Kashiwagi Nagisa wa Nagusametai); 65. Miko Ino Wants to Correct (伊井野ミコは正したい, Iino Miko wa Tadashitai); 66. Kaguya Wants to Eliminate (かぐや様は蹴落としたい, Kaguya-sama wa Keotoshitai); 67. Miko Ino Can't be Laughed At (伊井野ミコを笑わせない, Iino Miko o Warawasenai); 68. I Want To Make Miko Ino Smile (伊井野ミコを笑わせたい, Iino Miko o Warawasetai); 69. Kaguya Hasn't Been Called (かぐや様は呼ばれない, Kaguya-sama wa Yobarenai); 70. Kaguya Wants to Strip (かぐや様は脱がせたい, Kaguya-sama wa Nugasetai)
Miyuki wants to ask Kaguya to give the endorsement speech for his campaign re-election, but the other students think of it as a confession opportunity. Kaguya and Miyuki draw each other for art class. Kaguya is bothered by Miyuki's non-tired look. She confides with Nagisa on whether her wavering feelings might not mean true love. Miyuki meets opposing candidate Miko Ino, who challenges Miyuki's lack of campaigning. Kaguya tries to persuade Miko to defer running for president, but Miko refuses. After campaign speeches by Miko's friend Kobachi Osaragi and by Kaguya, Miko gives her speech but struggles to get her points across, so Miyuki engages her in an impromptu debate. Miyuki eventually wins the election, but by a much closer margin; he gets Miko to join the student council. Meanwhile, Kaguya, who collapsed after seeing the election results, worries whether she will be picked for the student council. The student council debate over preferred undergarments.
8	January 19, 2018	978-4-08-890840-3	May 7, 2019	978-1-9747-0440-8
71. Kaguya Wants to Make Him Let Go (かぐや様は出させたい, Kaguya-sama wa Dasasetai); 72. Miko Ino Wants to Control Herself (伊井野ミコは抑えたい, Iino Miko wa Osaetai); 73. Miyuki Shirogane Wants to Make Her Read (白銀御行は読ませたい, Shirogane Miyuki wa Yomasetai); 74. Kaguya ♡ Aquarium (かぐや様♡アクアリウム, Kaguya-sama ♡ Aquarium); 75. Kaguya Wants to Collect (かぐや様は集めたい, Kaguya-sama wa Atsumetai); 76. Nagisa Kashiwagi is Complicated (柏木渚はめんどくさい, Kashiwagi Nagisa wa Mendokusai); 77. Chika Fujiwara Wants to Find Out (藤原千花は聞き出したい, Fujiwara Chika wa Kikidashitai); 78. Kaguya Doesn't Scare Easily (かぐや様は怯えない, Kaguya-sama wa Obienai); 79. Kaguya Wants to Be Examined (かぐや様は診られたい, Kaguya-sama wa Miraretai); 80. Thus, Yu Ishigami Closes His Eyes, Part 2 (そして、石上優は目を閉じた②, Soshite, Ishigami Yū wa Me o Tojita Ni)
After talking with Ai about how physical touch helps release hormones that keep men monogamous, Kaguya gives Miyuki a hand massage. When Miko gets upset that the student council lacks discipline, Chika helps her do some silly and somewhat rebellious things. When Kei cries over a Bessatsu Margaret shojo manga, Miyuki gets hooked, and plots how he can get Kaguya to read the manga. After the student council members read the manga, and they all feel giddy about romance, Kaguya tries to get Miyuki to ask her out to an aquarium date. The student council compete over collecting bellmarks ("points" from purchasing products). Kashiwagi's boyfriend asks the council about dealing with the question: "Do you know why I'm mad at you?" During a girls' night party with Miko, Kaguya asks Chika if there is someone she likes, and gets really worried when Chika affirms. When Kaguya and Miyuki get stuck inside the sports equipment shed, it is not clear who will make the first move. When Kaguya faints and is taken to the hospital, Dr. Tanuma concludes she has lovesickness, but Kaguya adamantly denies that. A few days into her position, Miko wants to quit the council because of their perceived lecherous lifestyle, but her friend Kobachi Osaragi has her interpret what she has seen.
9	April 19, 2018	978-4-08-890891-5	July 2, 2019	978-1-9747-0509-2
81. Kaguya Wants to Touch (かぐや様は触りたい, Kaguya-sama wa Sawaritai); 82. Kaguya Doesn't Say No (かぐや様は断らない, Kaguya-sama wa Kotowaranai); 83. Kei Shirogane Won't Speak (白銀圭は話せない, Shirogane Kei wa Hanasenai); 84. Miyuki Shirogane Wants to Dance (白銀御行は踊りたい, Shirogane Miyuki wa Odoritai); 85. Kobachi Osaragi Wants to Crack Down (大仏こばちは取り締まりたい, Osaragi Kobachi wa Torishimaritai); 86. Miyuki Shirogane's Dad Wants to Find Out (白銀父は聞き出したい, Shirogane Chichi wa Kikidashitai); 87. Shuchiin Sports Festival (秀知院は体育祭, Shuchiin wa Taiikusai); 88. Thus, Yu Ishigami Closes His Eyes, Part 3 (そして，石上優は目を閉じた③, Soshite, Ishigami Yū wa Me o Tojita San); 89. Miyuki Shirogane and Yu Ishigami (白銀御行と石上優, Shirogane Miyuki to Ishigami Yū); 90. Kyoko Otomo Doesn't Realize (大友京子は気付かない, Ōtomo Kyōko wa Kidzukanai); 91. Chika Fujiwara Wants to Inflate (藤原千花は膨らませたい, Fujiwara Chika wa Fukuramasetai)
To help Kaguya's emotional embarrassment over being with Miyuki, Ai has Kaguya use a calming ritual by touching her hand to her cheek. Yu joins the cheering club and has to borrow a girls' uniform to wear for the upcoming sports day. Although Kei is being rebellious against her brother, she wonders if she can help him ease his romance troubles. Chika tries to teach Miyuki the Sōran Bushi dance, but when she gives up and Kaguya starts teaching him, she gets jealous. Kobachi and Miko go about their daily duties as discipline committee members. Miyuki and Chika's fathers show up at the sports day. Miyuki's father asks Kaguya about his son without letting her know who he is. The student council members are enjoying the sports day activities. Yu encounters former classmate Kyoko Otomo, and recalls his back story in junior high when he was suspended for punching Kyoko's boyfriend, and consequently shunned by his classmates. Miyuki and the student council discover the truth of Yu's situation and support him. Yu finishes his anchor leg in the relay race. The student council have a contest where they take turns trying to inflate a balloon without popping it.
10	June 19, 2018	978-4-08-891041-3	September 3, 2019	978-1-9747-0663-1
92. Someone Wants Kaguya to Be Shy (かぐや様を照れさせたい, Kaguya-sama o Teresasetai); 93. Kaguya Wants to Distract Him (かぐや様は連れ出したい, Kaguya-sama wa Tsuredashitai); 94. Kaguya Preemptively Strikes (かぐや様は阻止したい, Kaguya-sama wa Soshishitai); 95. Miko Ino Wants to Be Soothed (伊井野ミコは癒されたい, Iino Miko wa Iyasaretai); 96. Kaguya Wants Him to Eat (かぐや様は食べさせたい, Kaguya-sama wa Tabesasetai); 97. Nagisa Kashiwagi Wants to Kill (柏木渚は誅したい, Kashiwagi Nagisa wa Chūshitai); 98. Maki Shijo Wants to Take Action (四条眞妃は何とかしたい, Shijō Maki wa Nantokashitai); 99. Miyuki Shirogane Wants to Be Believed (白銀御行は信じられたい, Shirogane Miyuki wa Shinjiraretai); 100. The Student Council Would Like a Group Photo (生徒会は撮られたい, Seitokai wa Toraretai); 101. The Student Council Is Going to Get That Group Photo (生徒会は撮らせたい, Seitokai wa Torasetai)
Miyuki starts complimenting Kaguya more to see whether she likes him as more than just friends. Miyuki is invited by his classmates to a cross-school function at a karaoke place, but when it seems to be more of a group date, Kaguya sends Ai to "chaperone" him (keep him away from prospective romantic interests), but when Ai tells Kaguya that she may take advantage of the situation by being alone with Miyuki, Kaguya rushes to try to stop her. Yu inadvertently overhears Miko's playlist when she forgets to plug her earphones in all the way. The student council has a fried rice cooking contest. Nagisa suspects her boyfriend is cheating on her and seeks Kaguya and Miko's advice, but it turns out he was with Nagisa's friend Maki Shijo to buy a present for her. Maki went along to help the boyfriend, but she harbors feelings for him and vents about it to Miyuki and Yu. Chika has the student council play a ten-yen game where everyone can vote anonymously on people's questions. When the principal takes photos of the student council, Kaguya refuses to participate until she sees Miyuki and Chika pretend to be a couple. She accidentally drops her flip phone and it is damaged beyond repair. Although she buys a replacement, she is saddened that she lost all her pictures, until Chika and the others create a message group where they can share all their photos.
11	September 19, 2018	978-4-08-891094-9	November 5, 2019	978-1-9747-0779-9
102. Kaguya Doesn't Realize (かぐや様は気づかない, Kaguya-sama wa Kidzukanai); 103. Miyuki Shirogane Wants to Meditate (白銀御行は取り持ちたい, Shirogane Miyuki wa Torimochitai); 104. Kaguya Shinomiya's Impossible Challenge: "The Swallow's Cowry" Part 1 (四宮かぐやの無理難題「燕の子安貝」編①, Shinomiya Kaguya no Muri Nandai「Tsubame no Koyasugai」Hen Ichi); 105. Yu Ishigami Wants to Prove Himself Worthy (石上優はこたえたい, Ishigami Yū wa Kotaetai); 106. Chika Fujiwara Wants to Stay Over (藤原千花は泊まりたい, Fujiwara Chika wa Tomaritai); 107. Chika Fujiwara Wants to Beat a Rhythm (藤原千花は刻みたい, Fujiwara Chika wa Kizamitai); 108. Ai Hayasaka Wants to Talk (早坂愛は話したい, Hayasaka Ai wa Hanashitai); 109. Maki Shijo Wants Some Help (四条眞妃は頼りたい, Shijō Maki wa Tayoritai); 110. Yu Ishigami Wants to Discuss It (石上優は語りたい, Ishigami Yū wa Kataritai); 111. The Student Council Wants to Move Forward (生徒会は進みたい, Seitokai wa Susumitai)
Ai realizes that Kaguya has not learned how read notifications work on her smart phone. Miyuki and Kobachi try to figure out why Miko and Yu dislike each other and how to have the two get along better. Kaguya sees Yu is romantically interested in Tsubame Koyasu, a popular senior in the cheer squad who has been very kind to him. The student council agree to take a break to prepare for their next round of exams, although they are deceptive as to their reasons. Chika has a sleepover at Kaguya's place, meeting Ai cross-dressed as a male butler Mr. Haski, but when they video call Miyuki and ask him who he likes, Kei interrupts, saying he has been texting a lot with Haski. Miyuki asks Chika to help him become a better rapper, in order to tell Ai what he thinks about her personas. He does this in front of Ai, Chika, and Kaguya. Maki confides with Miyuki and Yu about her sadness with seeing Nagisa and her boyfriend being closer. After Yu and Miyuki share their excitement over a manga getting an anime adaptation, Yu does not want Kaguya and Chika to know he is a hardcore anime otaku so he makes Miyuki out to be one. The second-year students have parent-teacher conferences, with Miyuki's father and Ai's mother joining in the fun as Kaguya's guardians.
12	December 19, 2018	978-4-08-891178-6	January 7, 2020	978-1-9747-0957-1
112. Miyuki Shirogane Wants to Make Her Confess, Part 1 (白銀御行は告らせたい①, Shirogane Miyuki wa Kokurasetai Ichi); 113. Miyuki Shirogane Wants to Make Her Confess, Part 2 (白銀御行は告らせたい②, Shirogane Miyuki wa Kokurasetai Ni); 114. Miyuki Shirogane Wants to Make Her Confess, Part 3 (白銀御行は告らせたい③, Shirogane Miyuki wa Kokurasetai San); 115. Miko Ino Can't Love, Part 1 (伊井野ミコは愛せない①, Iino Miko wa Aisenai Ichi); 116. Students Wish to Discuss the Culture Festival (文化祭を語りたい, Bunkasai o Kataritai); 117. Chika Fujiwara Wants to Fight (藤原千花は闘いたい, Fujiwara Chika wa Tatakaitai); 118. Miyuki Shirogane Wants to Blow It Up (白銀御行は膨らませたい, Shirogane Miyuki wa Fukuramasetai); 119. Kei Shirogane Wants to Show Off (白銀圭は見せつけたい, Shirogane Kei wa Misetsuketai); 120. About Kaguya Shinomiya, Part 2 (四宮かぐやについて②, Shinomiya Kaguya ni Tsuite Ni); 121. Spring of First Year (1年生 春, Ichinensei Haru)
Kaguya tries on different cosplay outfits for Miyuki to review, but is surprised how straightforward his answers are. When Miyuki asks Kaguya to check out a neighboring school's festival with him, Kaguya declines, but then has second thoughts as she missed her chance to go on a date with him. Kayuga asks Miyuki, but he hesitates and they both solicit input from their student council members. After Chika tells Miyuki to look at himself more objectively, Miyuki ponders if he lacks sex appeal, so he asks Miko and then Chika what they think of him as a man and a romantic interest. Yu and Miko join the cultural festival committee. Media Club members Karen and Erika interview folks from each of the clubs. The student council have an arm wrestling contest. Miyuki has trouble making balloon animals. Kei is appalled by her brother's wardrobe. Tsubame shares with Kaguya about the origins of the heart gift at the festival, Kaguya admits to Ai that she likes Miyuki. A flashback chapter shows Miyuki as a first-year being recruited to the student council and meeting Kaguya for the first time.
13	January 18, 2019	978-4-08-891193-9	March 3, 2020	978-1-9747-1071-3
122. Kaguya Wants to Confess (かぐや様は告りたい, Kaguya-sama wa Tsugeritai); 123. Kaguya's Culture Festival (かぐや様の文化祭, Kaguya-sama no Bunkasai); 124. Yu Ishigami's Culture Festival (石上優の文化祭, Ishigami Yū no Bunkasai); 125. Kozue Makihara Wants to Have Fun (槇原こずえは遊びたい, Makihara Kozue wa Asobitai); 126. Chika Fujiwara Wants to Unmask (藤原千花は暴きたい, Fujiwara Chika wa Abakitai); 127. Miyuki Shirogane's Cultural Festival (白銀御行の文化祭, Shirogane Miyuki no Bunkasai); 128. Kaguya Wants to Shoot (かぐや様は撃ち抜きたい, Kaguya-sama wa Uchinukitai); 129. Miyuki Shirogane Wants to Make Her Confess, Part 4 (白銀御行は告らせたい④, Shirogane Miyuki wa Kokurasetai Yon); 130. Tsubame Koyasu Wants to Say No (子安つばめは断りたい, Koyasu Tsubame wa Kotowaritai); 131. Miyuki Shirogane Wants to Make Her Confess, Part 5 (白銀御行は告らせたい⑤, Shirogane Miyuki wa Kokurasetai Go)
Kaguya struggles with whether to confess to Miyuki at the school festival, but after overhearing Kobachi Osaragi's dating situation, she encourages Yu to confess to Tsubame. Kaguya helps her class cosplay cafe. Maki advises Yu on asking Tsubame out, but her perception is distorted by her own situation with Nagisa and Tsubasa. Maki suggests Yu invites Tsubame to the haunted attraction where participants are blindfolded in a locker and listen via earphones to a scary scenario of a mad person planning to cut off their ears. Chika and Kaguya separately attempt to dissuade Moeha from falling in love with Miyuki. When Yu wins a heart-shaped cookie from a shooting gallery game, and gives it to Tsubame, she runs off in embarrassment; he is completely unaware that giving a heart-shaped object during the festival is the equivalent of a love confession. Miyuki and Chika talk about Yu's chances of success. Kaguya tries to secretly give a heart-shaped takoyaki to Miyuki but the other council members want some as well. When the heart-shaped festival balloons were stolen, Detective Chika runs off to investigate. Kaguya gets Miyuki to make her balloon art but panics when she sees the price for buying the heart-shaped balloon art. She talks with Tsubame who is pondering how to turn down Yu's confession without hurting him. Miyuki and Kaguya get their love fortune told. The others appear to almost ruin their time together only to be sent off as quickly as they arrive. Miyuki eventually tells Kaguya that he got accepted to Stanford and will be studying overseas.
14	March 19, 2019	978-4-08-891231-8	May 5, 2020	978-1-9747-1472-8
132. Kaguya Wants to Confess, Part 2 (かぐや様は告りたい②, Kaguya-sama wa Tsugeritai Ni); 133. Kaguya Wants to Confess, Part 3 (かぐや様は告りたい③, Kaguya-sama wa Tsugeritai San); 134. Two Confessions, Part 1 (二つの告白 前編, Futatsu no Kokuhaku Zenpen); 135. Two Confessions, Part 2 (二つの告白 中編, Futatsu no Kokuhaku Chūhen); 136. Two Confessions, Part 3 (二つの告白 後編, Futatsu no Kokuhaku Kōhen); 137. Shuchiin Academy's Closing Party (秀知院は後夜祭, Shuchiin wa Matsuri); 138. Kaguya Wants to Tell (かぐや様は教えたい, Kaguya-sama wa Oshietai); 139. Miyuki Shirogane Wants to Talk Things Over (白銀御行は語り合いたい, Shirogane Miyuki wa Katariaitai); 140. Miko Ino Wants to Talk (伊井野ミコは語りたい, Iino Miko wa Kataritai); 141. About Kaguya Shinomiya, Part 3 (四宮かぐやについて③, Shinomiya Kaguya ni Tsuite San)
Kaguya shares with Ai about Miyuki planning on going to Stanford; they plan how she can confess to Miyuki at the festival's night activity. Tsubame tells Yu to decide on a time when she should give him an answer, but Yu thinks she is talking about flower viewing, and later realizes he might have accidentally confessed to her. After Kaguya lights the bonfire, there is a message that Arsène Lupin will be stealing the festival, and that the "dragon's jewel" on one of the major decorations has gone missing. After Chika continues to track down some clues, Kaguya tells Ai that she knows that Miyuki planned this, including sending Chika on a wild goose chase. Kaguya finds him at the top of the clock tower. She is about to tell Miyuki her true feelings, when Miyuki surprises her by having a weather balloon released and popped, scattering the heart balloons all over the area. He asks her to join him at Stanford. As she holds one of the balloons, she responds that he should give her a reward for finding him and kisses him. Yu finds the heart-shaped pendant that Kaguya dropped but gives it to Miko to turn it in as lost-and-found. Kaguya shares with Ai that she kissed Miyuki but when Ai discovers it was a french kiss, Ai expresses her concern that it would lead to sexual intercourse. Kaguya shows up at the student council in her chibi form. After Yu, Miyuki, and Miko talk about a comic having a live-action adaptation, Miko confiscates Yu's manga magazine and they fight. Tsubame interrupts and invites both of them to her Christmas Eve party; Chika is also hosting a party with Kaguya. While she naps in the student council room, Kaguya has a courtroom trial in her mind with her different Kaguya personalities debating over what to do. The ice cold Kaguya is upset that she did not get kissed and takes over Kaguya as her main personality.
15	July 19, 2019	978-4-08-891320-9	July 7, 2020	978-1-9747-1473-5
142. Regarding Kaguya Shinomiya, Part 4 (四宮かぐやについて④, Shinomiya Kaguya ni Tsuite San); 143. Kaguya Wants To Be Noticed (Ice) (かぐや様は気づかれたい（氷）, Kaguya-sama wa Kizukaretai（Kōri）); 144. Kaguya Wants to Confide (Ice) (かぐや様は許したい（氷）, Kaguya-sama wa Yurushitai（Kōri）); 145. Kaguya Wants to Eat (Ice) (かぐや様はいただきたい（氷）, Kaguya-sama wa Itadakitai（Kōri）); 146. Our Personas (Kaguya, Part 1) (私達の仮面（かぐや編①）, Watashitachi no Kamen（Kaguya Hen Ichi）); 147. Our Personas (Shirogane, Part 1) (私達の仮面（白銀編①）, Watashitachi no Kamen（Shirogane Hen Ichi）); 148. Kaguya Wants to Confess (Ice) (かぐや様は告りたい（氷）, Kaguya-sama wa Tsugeritai（Kōri）); 149. Kaguya Thinks It's Fine (かぐや様はこれでいい, Kaguya-sama wa Kore De ī); 150. A Normal Romance (普通のロマンティック, Futsū no Romantikku); 151. The First Kiss Never Ends (ファーストキスは終わらない, Fāsutokisu wa Owaranai)
Kaguya puts Miyuki under increasing stress when he does not notice her subtle invitations to kiss or to hold hands. Kaguya ends up running away from Miyuki when she walks into him before her freshly applied perfume reaches its optimal scent. Kaguya and Miyuki independently ask Nagisa and Maki for love advice. Kaguya tries to make Miyuki share his lunch with her and kiss her, but he eventually collapses from the built-up stress. Kaguya visits Miyuki in hospital, worried about her negative personality traits. Miyuki confides to the doctor how he constantly strives to improve himself in order to get closer to Kaguya. Ai secretly mediates between Kaguya and Miyuki. Kaguya, Miyuki and Kei attend Chika and Moeha's somewhat messed up Christmas party. Kaguya and Miyuki finally have a deep talk with each other and share a second kiss. Kaguya and Miyuki talk and think about what they have achieved so far.
16	September 19, 2019	978-4-08-891367-4	September 1, 2020	978-1-9747-1710-1
152. Nagisa Kashiwagi Wants to Conceal (柏木渚は隠したい, Kashiwagi Nagisa wa Kakushitai); 153. The Swallow's Cowry (Ice) (「燕の子安貝」編（氷）, 「Tsubame no Koyasugai」Hen（Kōri）); 154. Kaguya Shinomiya's Impossible Challenge: "The Swallow's Cowry" Part 2 (四宮かぐやの無理難題「燕の子安貝」編②, Shinomiya Kaguya no Muri Nandai「Tsubame no Koyasugai」Hen Ni); 155. Kaguya Shinomiya's Impossible Challenge: "The Swallow's Cowry" Part 3 (四宮かぐやの無理難題「燕の子安貝」編③, Shinomiya Kaguya no Muri Nandai「Tsubame no Koyasugai」Hen San); 156. Miko Ino Cannot Love, Part 2 (伊井野ミコは愛せない②, Iino Miko wa Aisenai Ni); 157. Chika Fujiwara Really, Really Wants to Eat (藤原千花は超超食べたい, Fujiwara Chika wa Chō Chō Tabetai); 158. Miko Ino Cannot Love, Part 3 (伊井野ミコは愛せない③, Iino Miko wa Aisenai San); 159. Kaguya Is..., Part 1 (かぐや様は 前編, Kaguya-sama wa Zenpen); 160. Kaguya Is..., Part 2 (かぐや様は 後編, Kaguya-sama wa Kōhen); 161. Maki Shijo Wants to be Enlightened (四条眞妃は悟りたい, Shijō Maki wa Satoritai)
After the Christmas holidays, Nagisa notices the change in Kaguya's and Miyuki's relationship; as well as Yu suddenly being overly caring for Miko. At Christmas, before attending their respective parties, Kaguya and Yu help each other picking presents. At Tsubame's Christmas party, Yu is made to stay the night; Miko gets drunk and stays too. Tsubame makes sexual advances on Yu, but he declines, realizing that she is still reluctant to enter an ongoing relationship. Deeply depressed, Yu falls down the stairs in a fatal way, but is saved by Miko, who breaks her arm in the process. Chika and an elderly ramen foodie try out ultra-spicy ramen. Rei visits Miko at home and suggests demanding more responsibility from Yu for breaking her arm, leading to the current situation. Kaguya enjoys an arguably first date with Miyuki. Kaguya and Miyuki avoid running into their friends, properly confess to each other and kiss again; Miyuki's father, posing as a fortune teller, discusses the topic of love with Tsubame. Maki spends Christmas in India, seeking to be relieved from her unrequited love through enlightenment.
17	January 17, 2020	978-4-08-891457-2	November 3, 2020	978-1-9747-1874-0
162. Student Council: New Game (生徒会のNEW GAME, Seitokai no Nyū Gēmu); 163. Chika Fujiwara Wants to Surprise (藤原千花は驚かせたい, Fujiwara Chika wa Odoroka Setai); 164. Chika Fujiwara Wants to Love (藤原千花は愛したい, Fujiwara Chika wa Aishitai); 165. Senpai-kun and Kouhai-chan, Part 1 (先輩くんと後輩ちゃん①, Senpai-kun to Kōhai-Chan Ichi); 166. Yu Ishigami Wants to Get Hooked (石上優はハマりたい, Ishigami Yū wa Hamaritai); 167. Nagisa Kashiwagi Wants to Drag It out of Her (柏木渚は聞き出したい, Kashiwagi Nagisa wa Kikidashitai); 168. First Encounter (ファーストコミュニケーション, Fāsu to Komyunikēshon); 169. The ABCs of Men and Women, Part 1 (男と女のABC①, Otoko to Onna no ABC Ichi); 170. Miyuki Shirogane Wants to Talk (白銀御行は話したい, Shirogane Miyuki wa Hanashitai); 171. We Want to Talk About the Tabletop Gaming Club (TG部を語りたい, TG-bu o Kataritai)
Everyone starts the new year with certain troubles and objectives. Chika plans to play a prank on Kaguya, who instead pranks her back with the secretly true claim of dating Miyuki. Chika starts a game in which one must make their opponent blush by saying they love them. Miyuki finds himself in an awkward situation when he tries to have a casual conversation with Miko. A workout training by Kazeno (now heartbroken after Kobachi broke off with him) catches the attention of the student council. Worried that Kaguya might somehow mess up her first time, Nagisa lends her a pornographic DVD. Kaguya and Maki manage to overcome their mutual hostility that had been fueled by the Shinomiya-Shijo feud. After watching the DVD together, both girls wonder how sexuality will play into the romance of Kaguya and Miyuki. Miyuki enjoys a nightly phone call with Kaguya but is eavesdropped by Kei and his father. Kozue provokes a major misunderstanding, causing Karen to call the police.
18	April 17, 2020	978-4-08-891527-2	February 2, 2021	978-1-9747-2100-9
172. Kaguya Wants to Talk (かぐや様は信じたい, Kaguya-sama wa Shinjitai); 173. Chika Fujiwara Wants to Tie (藤原千花は結びたい, Fujiwara Chika wa Musubitai); 174. Miko Ino Cannot Love, Part 4 (伊井野ミコは愛せない④, Iino Miko wa Aisenai Yon); 175. Kaguya Wants His Attention (かぐや様は構われたい, Kaguya-sama wa Kamawa Retai); 176. Yu Ishigami Wants to Show Off (石上優は見せつけたい, Ishigami Yū wa Misetsuketai); 177. Kaguya Shinomiya's Impossible Challenge: "The Swallow's Cowry" Part 4 (四宮かぐやの無理難題「燕の子安貝」編④, Shinomiya Kaguya no Muri Nandai「Tsubame no Koyasugai」Hen Yon); 178. Senpai-kun and Kouhai-chan, Part 2 (先輩くんと後輩ちゃん②, Senpai-kun to Kōhai-Chan Ni); 179. Ai Hayasaka's Morning Routine (早坂愛のモーニングルーティン, Hayasaka Ai no Mōningu Rūtin); 180. Miyuki Shirogane Wants to Go Around (白銀御行は廻りたい, Shirogane Miyuki wa Mawaritai); 181. Miyuki Shirogane Wants to Keep Her for Himself (白銀御行は独占したい, Shirogane Miyuki wa Dokusen Shitai)
Rei accidentally learns about Kaguya dating Miyuki but decides to keep the secret. The student council is confronted with the claim that being able to tie a cherry stem in the mouth implies being a good kisser. Yu tries being nice to Miko and discovers a much brighter side of her in return. Kaguya feels smoochy but repeatedly fails to catch Miyuki's attention. Yu trains for impressing Tsubame during a volleyball match and eventually has her agree to a date. Yu, Kaguya and Ai come up with somewhat faulty ideas for a date. When Tsubame feels uneasy about the rumors surrounding Yu, Kobachi hands her the student council's secret report on the matter. In addition to her exhausting full-time job as Kaguya's attendant, Ai has always been required to secretly report back to Kaguya's family. On first day of the second years' school trip, Miyuki has fun with his male pals while Kaguya is deeply troubled by a sudden announcement from Ai to be quitting her job. Miyuki wants to prevent Kaguya from being publicly seen with wet hair.
19	July 17, 2020	978-4-08-891646-0	May 4, 2021	978-1-9747-2286-0
182. Ai Hayasaka's Friends, Part 1 (早坂愛の友達①, Hayasaka Ai no Tomodachi Ichi); 183. Ai Hayasaka's Friends, Part 2 (早坂愛の友達②, Hayasaka Ai no Tomodachi Ni); 184. Ai Hayasaka's Friends, Part 3 (早坂愛の友達③, Hayasaka Ai no Tomodachi San); 185. Ai Hayasaka's Friends, Part 4 (早坂愛の友達④, Hayasaka Ai no Tomodachi Yon); 186. Ai Hayasaka's Friends, Part 5 (早坂愛の友達⑤, Hayasaka Ai no Tomodachi Go); 187. Ai Hayasaka and Kaguya Shinomiya's Friends (早坂愛と四宮かぐやの友達, Hayasaka Ai to Shinomiya Kaguya no Tomodachi); 188. Miko Ino Can't Make Him Answer (伊井野ミコは聞き出せない, Iino Miko wa Kikidasenai); 189. Kaguya Shinomiya's Impossible Challenge: "The Buddha's Stone Begging Bowl" (四宮かぐやの無理難題「仏の御石の鉢」編, Shinomiya Kaguya no Muri Nandai「Butsu no O Ishi No Hachi」Hen); 190. Senpai-kun and Kouhai-chan, Part 3 & Miko Ino Cannot Love, Part 5 (先輩くんと後輩ちゃん③&伊井野ミコは愛せない⑤, Senpai-kun to Kōhai-Chan San & Iino Miko wa Aisenai Go); 191. Kaguya Shinomiya's Impossible Challenge: "The Swallow's Cowry" Part 5 (四宮かぐやの無理難題「燕の子安貝」編⑤, Shinomiya Kaguya no Muri Nandai「Tsubame no Koyasugai」Hen Go)
With Ai no longer under Kaguya's protection, Un'yo Shinomiya, one of Kaguya's brothers, wants to secure her valuable intel for himself by any means; she finally opens up to Miyuki. Aided by Chika, Ai and Miyuki initially shake off Ai's pursuers. Ai and Miyuki are overpowered by Un'yo and his henchmen while Kaguya and Nao seek for Ai. Hoping to break their bond, Un'yo reveals Ai's spying activities to Kaguya as she arrives on the scene. Understanding Ai's burden, Kaguya is willing to forgive her, prompting Un'yo to give up and leave. Free at last, Ai leaves the school trip early, yet ultimately stays at Shuchiin and becomes actual friends with Kaguya. Chika tries to settle an argument between Yu and Miko using a word-building game. Kaguya and Kobachi fiercely debate against Chika and Rei on whether Yu should end up with Tsubame or with Miko. Miyuki presses Miko on the matter, who indeed has romantic feelings for Yu. Tsubame questions the nature of her relationship with Yu even after a successful date.
20	November 19, 2020	978-4-08-891716-0	August 3, 2021	978-1-9747-2403-1
192. Kobachi Osaragi Is Watching (大仏こばちは見つめてる, Osaragi Kobachi wa Mitsume Teru); 193. Miyuki Shirogane Wants to Console (白銀御行は慰めたい, Shirogane Miyuki wa Nagusametai); 194. Valentine's at Shuchi'in, Part 1 (秀知院はバレンタイン 前編, Shuchiin wa Barentain Zenpen); 195. Valentine's at Shuchi'in, Part 2 (秀知院はバレンタイン 後編, Shuchiin wa Barentain Kōhen); 196. Ai Hayasaka Wants To Find (早坂愛は見付けたい, Hayasaka Ai wa Mitsuketai); 197. The Shirogane Family Wants To Move (白銀家は引っ越したい, Shirogane-ke wa Hikkoshitai); 198. Kaguya Shinomiya's Impossible Challenge: "The Swallow's Cowry" Part 6 (四宮かぐやの無理難題「燕の子安貝」編⑥, Shinomiya Kaguya no Muri Nandai「Tsubame no Koyasugai」Hen Roku); 199. Kaguya Wants to Be Heard (かぐや様はきかせたい, Kaguya-sama wa Kikasetai); 200. Chika Fujiwara Wants a Celebration (藤原千花は祝われたい, Fujiwara Chika wa Iwawa Retai); 201. Tsubame Koyasu Wants to Overwrite (子安つばめは塗り替えたい, Koyasu Tsubame wa Nurikaetai)
Kobachi recalls her personal experiences with Tsubame and Yu, convinced that these two deserve finding happiness together. Recognizing Maki's predicament as the likely fate for Miko as well, Miyuki decides to support the latter in winning Yu over. Before valentine's day, Ai and Kaguya discuss what chocolate to give to Miyuki, who in turn encourages Miko to give some to Yu. Valentine's day takes place with favourable outcomes for everyone. Miyuki, Yu, Maki and Ai hang out together and grow closer as friends. With his father now enjoying a vast reliable income, Miyuki is tasked with finding a more suitable home for the family. With helpful learning support mainly from Kaguya, Yu manages to score 36th place in the exams. Kaguya worries that Miyuki might slack off now that he has secured her affection and tries to test his resolve. The student council celebrates Chika's and Yu's shared birthdays. Tsubame, with the help of many others, starts a rumor that finally clears Yu's name.
21	February 19, 2021	978-4-08-891753-5	December 7, 2021	978-1-9747-2518-2
202. Shuchi'in Academy Wants to See Them Off (秀知院は見送りたい, Shuchiin wa Miokuritai); 203. Tsubame Koyasu and Yu Ishigami, Part 1 (子安つばめと石上優 前編, Koyasu Tsubame to Ishigami Yū Zenpen); 204. Tsubame Koyasu and Yu Ishigami, Part 2 (子安つばめと石上優 後編, Koyasu Tsubame to Ishigami Yū Kōhen); 205. Chika Fujiwara Wants to Make Him Laugh (藤原千花は笑わせたい, Fujiwara Chika wa Warawasetai); 206. Miyuki Shirogane Isn't Depressing (白銀御行は重くない, Shirogane Miyuki wa Omokunai); 207. Kei Shirogane Wants to be Welcoming (白銀圭は迎えたい, Shirogane Kei wa Mukaetai); 208. The Shirogane Family (白銀家, Shirogane-ke); 209. Dreams (夢, Yume); 210. Chika Fujiwara Really, Really, Really Wants to Eat (藤原千花は超超超食べたい, Fujiwara Chika wa Chō Chō Chō Tabetai); 211. Kaguya Wants to Sit (かぐや様は座りたい, Kaguya-sama wa Suwaritai)
The graduating 3rd years, including Gigako, Shizuku, the former student council president and Kazeno, are seen off by their younger friends. Tsubame meets with Yu for her final answer to his confession, which he passionately reinforces. Tsubame explains she cannot see Yu as a romantic partner, but honestly wishes to stay friends, whereupon he forces himself to part ways with a smile. The other student council members worry about heartbroken Yu's condition when he displays some erratic behavior. Miyuki and Miko point out each other's perceived creepiness. Miyuki is still asleep when Kaguya arrives for a pre-announced visit at his home, forcing Kei to cover for him. Kaguya learns that Miyuki's mother left her husband after he lost his company and originally took Kei with her because Miyuki did not live up to her expectations back then. Kaguya confirms to Miyuki that her family ruined said company and informs him that she had to withdraw her application at Stanford because her patriarchic eldest brother Oko currently has too much control over her life. Chika meets a ramen chef and another ramen foodie who are troubled by their respective pasts. Kaguya worries about the new class allocation and does not dare to check who is in her class.
22	May 19, 2021	978-4-08-891870-9	April 5, 2022	978-1-9747-2847-3
212. Mikado Shijo Wants to Fit In (四条帝は馴染みたい, Shijō Mikado wa Najimitai); 213. Senpai-kun and Kouhai-chan, Part 4 (先輩くんと後輩ちゃん④, Senpai-kun to Kōhai-Chan Yon); 214. Kaguya Hates Cats (かぐや様は猫嫌い, Kaguya-sama wa Neko Girai); 215. The ABCs of Men and Women, Part 2 (男と女のABC②, Otoko to Onna no ABC Ni); 216. Kaguya and the Girls Want to Talk (かぐやたちは語りたい, Kaguya Tachi wa Kataritai); 217. The ABCs of Men and Women, Part 3 (男と女のABC③, Otoko to Onna no ABC San); 218. The ABCs of Men and Women, Part 4 (男と女のABC④, Otoko to Onna no ABC Yon); 219. The ABCs of Men and Women, Part 5 (男と女のABC⑤, Otoko to Onna no ABC Go); 220. The ABCs of Men and Women, Part 6 (男と女のABC⑥, Otoko to Onna no ABC Roku); 221. Kaguya Wants to Talk (かぐや様は話したい, Kaguya-sama wa Hanashitai)
New transfer student Mikado Shijo, Maki's twin brother, quickly relates to Miyuki but also aims to win Kaguya over. The strange way Miyuki and Miko have gotten closer to each other catches the attention of Chika and Kaguya. Kaguya meets someone's cat in the student council room and cannot bring herself to admit that she finds it sweet. Miyuki, Mikado and Tsubasa engage in a discussion about bust sizes they find attractive, which Kaguya accidentally overhears. Kaguya meets with Maki, Ai and Nagisa to discuss both Mikado's suspicious transfer and how to deal with sexuality. Kaguya initially believes Miyuki is harassing her when he tries to covertly remove a burdock from her clothing. Kaguya accompanies Miyuki to his family's new home, where they learn that his father and Kei are out for the night. When Kaguya decides to stay the night, she and Miyuki secretly worry about whether and how to take the next step. After much hesitation, they spend the night in one bed and end up having sex. The next day, Miyuki and Kaguya reflect on their experience; Kaguya also tells Ai about it.
23	August 18, 2021	978-4-08-892054-2	August 2, 2022	978-1-9747-3218-0
222. Kaguya Shinomiya's Impossible Challenge: "The Jeweled Branch of Hourai" (四宮かぐやの無理難題「蓬莱の玉の枝」編, Shinomiya Kaguya no Muri Nandai「Hōrai no Tama no Eda」Hen); 223. Chika Fujiwara Refuses to Acknowledge (藤原千花は認めない, Fujiwara Chika wa Mitomenai); 224. Chika Fujiwara Wants to Teach (藤原千花は教えたい, Fujiwara Chika wa Oshietai); 225. Hikaru Oobayashi Wants to Protect (大林ヒカルは守りたい, Ōbayashi Hikaru wa Mamoritai); 226. Kaguya Shinomiya's Impossible Challenge: "The Buddha's Stone Begging Bowl" Part 2 (四宮かぐやの無理難題「仏の御石の鉢」編②, Shinomiya Kaguya no Muri Nandai「Butsu no O Ishi No Hachi」Hen Ni); 227. Miko Ino Wants To Console (伊井野ミコは慰めたい, Iino Miko wa Nagusametai); 228. Kaguya Shinomiya's Impossible Challenge: "The Buddha's Stone Begging Bowl" Part 3 (四宮かぐやの無理難題「仏の御石の鉢」編③, Shinomiya Kaguya no Muri Nandai「Butsu no O Ishi No Hachi」Hen San); 229. Kaguya Shinomiya's Impossible Challenge: "The Buddha's Stone Begging Bowl" Part 4 (四宮かぐやの無理難題「仏の御石の鉢」編④, Shinomiya Kaguya no Muri Nandai「Butsu no O Ishi No Hachi」Hen Yon); 230. Kaguya Shinomiya's Impossible Challenge: "The Buddha's Stone Begging Bowl" Part 5 (四宮かぐやの無理難題「仏の御石の鉢」編⑤, Shinomiya Kaguya no Muri Nandai「Butsu no O Ishi No Hachi」Hen Go); 231. Kaguya Shinomiya's Impossible Challenge: "The Buddha's Stone Begging Bowl" Part 6 (四宮かぐやの無理難題「仏の御石の鉢」編⑥, Shinomiya Kaguya no Muri Nandai「Butsu no O Ishi No Hachi」Hen Roku)
Kaguya is reminded of how she got to know Chika after deciding to make her relationship with Miyuki public and tell her first. Chika is shocked by how the others were already aware of the situation and shows some reluctancy to accept it. For an upcoming ball with the French partner school, Chika practices dancing with Miyuki. Kaguya's homeroom teacher tries to present himself as an adult that his students can safely confide in. Chika encourages Miko to more aggressively present herself as a romance option to Yu. Chika is shocked by the passion Miko executes her advice with. Through Gigako's Discord server, Yu incidentally befriends his idol classmate Koromo Shiranui due to their shared hobby of playing hero shooters. Miko starts taking gaming lessons from Miyuki's father in order to enter Yu's bubble like Koromo did. Rei and Yu suspect Miko to be in a relationship with a sugar daddy and struggle whether to take action. Kobachi talks to Kaguya about Yu and Miko and starts denigrating the latter just as she enters the room by chance.
24	December 17, 2021	978-4-08-892161-7	December 6, 2022	978-1-9747-3448-1
232. Kaguya Shinomiya's Impossible Challenge: "The Buddha's Stone Begging Bowl" Part 7 (四宮かぐやの無理難題「仏の御石の鉢」編⑦, Shinomiya Kaguya no Muri Nandai「Butsu no O Ishi No Hachi」Hen Nana); 233. Kaguya Shinomiya's Impossible Challenge: "The Buddha's Stone Begging Bowl" Part 8 (四宮かぐやの無理難題「仏の御石の鉢」編⑧, Shinomiya Kaguya no Muri Nandai「Butsu no O Ishi No Hachi」Hen Hachi); 234. Kaguya Shinomiya's Impossible Challenge: "The Buddha's Stone Begging Bowl" Part 9 (四宮かぐやの無理難題「仏の御石の鉢」編⑨, Shinomiya Kaguya no Muri Nandai「Butsu no O Ishi No Hachi」Hen Ku); 235. Chika Fujiwara Wants To Date (藤原千花は付き合いたい, Fujiwara Chika wa Tsukiaitai); 236. Kaguya-sama Wants To Stay The Night (かぐや様は泊まりたい, Kaguya-sama wa Tomaritai); 237. Miyuki Shirogane Doesn't Want To Put It In (白銀御行は入れたくない, Shirogane Miyuki wa Iretakunai); 238. Yu Ishigami Wants to Invite (石上優は誘いたい, Ishigami Yū wa Sasoitai); 239. Adolphe Pescarolo Wants To Protect (Adolphe Pescaroloは守りたい, Adolphe Pescarolo wa Mamoritai); 240. Kaguya-sama Wants To Dance (かぐや様は踊りたい, Kaguya-sama wa Odoritai); 241. Un'yo Shinomiya Can't Talk (四宮雲鷹は話せない, Shinomiya Un'yo wa Hanasenai)
Kobachi explains how she has suppressed her own feelings for Yu in Miko's favour, only to see her rejecting him after the Ogino-incident. Kaguya discusses the complexity of the situation with Miyuki and later scolds Miko for her immature black and white thinking. Miko manages to make up with Kobachi and promises to not make Yu unhappy, which she accepts. With Kaguya now being less available to her, Chika expresses some interest in finding a boyfriend too. Kei struggles with mixed feelings about her brother openly dating someone she looks up to when Kaguya visits them at home. Ai figures out that Miyuki has bad eyesight and wants to make him try contacts. Yu is encouraged to invite Miko to the ball by Maki, who later begs her father to stall something for a little longer. After meeting Betsy again, Miyuki confronts the principal and is requested by him to protect Kaguya in a way the adults cannot. Everyone enjoys a short bliss as the ball takes place, however the next day, the Shinomiya conglomerate is facing a sudden demise and Kaguya stops coming to school. Un'yo invites Miyuki for a ride to fill him in on the situation; they later visit the Shinomiya siblings' elderly father Gan'an in hospital.
25	March 18, 2022	978-4-08-892252-2	April 4, 2023	978-1-9747-3632-4
242. The Shinomiya Family (四宮家, Shinomiya-ke); 243. Ai Hayasaka Wants To Dress Up (早坂愛は着替えたい, Hayasaka Ai wa Kigaetai); 244. Yu Ishigami Looks Down (石上優は下を向く, Ishigami Yū wa Shita o Muku); 245. Thus, Yu Ishigami Closed His Eyes, Part 4 (そして、石上優は目を閉じた④, Soshite, Ishigami Yū wa Me o Tojita Yon); 246. Thus, Yu Ishigami Closed His Eyes, Part 5 (そして、石上優は目を閉じた⑤, Soshite, Ishigami Yū wa Me o Tojita Go); 247. Yu Ishigami Can't Bring Himself to Say (石上優は言い出せない, Ishigami Yū wa Iidasenai); 248. Kaguya Wants to Break Up (かぐや様は別れたい①, Kaguya-sama wa Wakaretai Ichi); 249. Kaguya Wants to Break Up, Part 2 (かぐや様は別れたい②, Kaguya-sama wa Wakaretai Ni); 250. Miyuki Shirogane Wants to Rely (白銀御行は頼りたい, Shirogane Miyuki wa Tayoritai); 251. Mikado Shijo Wants to Protect (四条帝は守りたい, Shijō Mikado wa Mamoritai)
26	June 17, 2022	978-4-08-892364-2	August 1, 2023	978-1-9747-3875-5
252. Shozo Tanuma Wants to Talk (田沼正造は語りたい, Tanuma Shōzō wa Kataritai); 253. Miyuki Shirogane Wants to Request (白銀御行は申し込みたい, Shirogane Miyuki wa Mōshikomitai); 254. Miko Iino Doesn't Drain Her Noodles (伊井野ミコは湯切らない, Iino Miko wa yu Kiranai); 255. The Hayasaka Family Doesn't Approve (早坂一家は認めない, Hayasaka-ikka wa Mitomenai); 256. Mikado Shijo Wants To Save (四条帝は助けたい, Shijō Mikado wa Tasuketai); 257. Miko Iino Doesn't Do What's Right (伊井野ミコは正しくない, Iino Miko wa Tadashikunai); 258. Kaguya-sama Wants to Escape (かぐや様は抜け出したい, Kaguya-sama wa Nukedashitai); 259. Kaguya-sama Wants to Fulfill (かぐや様は叶えたい, Kaguya-sama wa Kanaetai); 260. Kaguya-sama Isn't Lonely (かぐや様は寂しくない, Kaguya-sama wa Sabishikunai); 261. Kaguya-sama Wants to be Confessed To (かぐや様は告らせたい, Kaguya-sama wa Kokurasetai)
27	October 19, 2022	978-4-08-892430-4	December 5, 2023	978-1-9747-4105-2
262. Kaguya-sama Wants to Return (かぐや様は戻りたい, Kaguya-sama wa Modoritai); 263. Kaguya-sama Wants to Provoke (かぐや様は煽りたい, Kaguya-sama wa Aoritai); 264. Kaguya-sama Wants to be Addressed (かぐや様は呼ばれたい, Kaguya-sama wa Yoba Retai); 265. Shirogane's Friends Want to Talk (友人たちは話したい, Yūjin-tachi wa Hanashitai); 266. Kaguya-sama Wants to Send Him Off, Part 1 (かぐや様は見送りたい 前編, Kaguya-sama wa Miokuritai Zenpen); 267. Kaguya-sama Wants to Send Him Off, Part 2 (かぐや様は見送りたい 後編, Kaguya-sama wa Miokuritai Kōhen); 268. Everyday Life, Part 1 (日常①, Nichijō Ichi); 269. Everyday Life, Part 2 (日常②, Nichijō Ni); 270. Everyday Life, Part 3 (日常③, Nichijō San); 271. Chika Fujiwara Really, Really, Really, Really Wants to Eat (藤原千花は超超超超食べたい, Fujiwara Chika wa Chō Chō Chō Chō Tabetai)
28	December 19, 2022	978-4-08-892534-9	April 2, 2024	978-1-9747-4342-1
272. Kei Shirogane's Final Chapter (白銀圭の最終回, Shirogane Kei no Saishūkai); 273. Maki Shijo, Nagisa Kashiwagi, and Tsubasa Tanuma's Final Chapter, Part 1 (四条眞妃と柏木渚と田沼翼の最終回前編, Shijo Maki Kashiwagi Nagisa to Tanuma Tsubasa no Saishūkai Zenpen); 274. Maki Shijo, Nagisa Kashiwagi, and Tsubasa Tanuma's Final Chapter, Part 2 (四条眞妃と柏木渚と田沼翼の最終回後編, Shijo Maki Kashiwagi Nagisa to Tanuma Tsubasa no Saishūkai Kōhen); 275. Kobachi Osaragi's Final Chapter (大仏こばちの最終回, Osaragi Kobachi no Saishūkai); 276. Ai Hayasaka's Final Chapter (早坂愛の最終回, Hayasaka Ai no Saishūkai); 277. Miko Iino and Yu Ishigami's Final Chapter, Part 1 (伊井野ミコと石上優の最終回前編, Iino Miko to Ishigami Yū no Saishūkai Zenpen); 278. Miko Iino and Yu Ishigami's Final Chapter, Part 2 (伊井野ミコと石上優の最終回後編, Iino Miko to Ishigami Yū no Saishūkai Kōhen); 279. Chika Fujiwara's Final Chapter (藤原千花の最終回, Fujiwara Chika no Saishūkai); 280. The Geniuses (天才たちの, Tensai-tachi no); 281. Goodbye, Shuchiin! (グッバイ秀知院, Gubbai Shuichi'in)
