= Philipp Ludwig von Seidel =

German mathematician

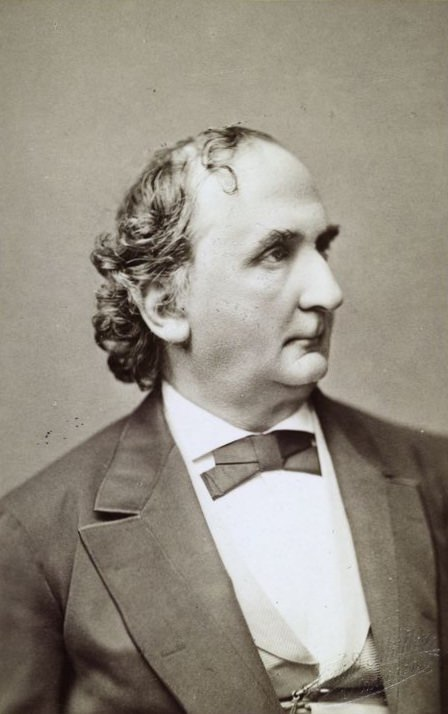
Portrait of Philipp Ludwig von Seidel

Philipp Ludwig von Seidel ([fɔn ˈzaɪdəl]; 24 October 1821 in Zweibrücken, Germany – 13 August 1896 in Munich, German Empire) was a German mathematician. He was the son of Julie Reinhold and Justus Christian Felix Seidel.

Philosopher and math theorist Imre Lakatos credits von Seidel with discovering, in 1847, the crucial analytic concept of uniform convergence, while analyzing an incorrect proof put forth earlier by Augustin-Louis Cauchy.

In 1857, von Seidel contributed to the field of optics when he decomposed the first order monochromatic aberrations into five constituent aberrations. They are now commonly referred to as the five Seidel Aberrations.

The lunar crater Seidel is named after him. His doctoral students include Eduard Study and Hermann Wiener.

The Gauss–Seidel method is a useful numerical iterative method for solving linear systems.

== See also ==
- Seidel triangle
