= MacGuffin =

Story plot device

In fiction, a MacGuffin (sometimes McGuffin) is an object, device, or event that is necessary to the plot and the motivation of the characters, but insignificant, unimportant, or irrelevant in itself. Thus, the use of a MacGuffin in a narrative is a plot device. The term was originated by Angus MacPhail for film, adopted by Alfred Hitchcock, and later extended to a similar device in other fiction.

The MacGuffin technique is common in films, especially thrillers. Usually, the MacGuffin is revealed in the first act, and thereafter declines in importance. It can reappear at the climax of the story but may actually be forgotten by the end of the story. Multiple MacGuffins are sometimes derisively identified as plot coupons—the characters "collect" the coupons to trade in for an ending.

== History and use ==
The use of the MacGuffin plot technique predates MacGuffin as the name of the technique. The Holy Grail of Arthurian legend has been cited as an early example of a MacGuffin. The Holy Grail is the desired object that is essential to initiate and advance the plot, but the final disposition of the Grail is never revealed, suggesting that the object is not of significance in itself. An even earlier example would be the Golden Fleece of Greek mythology, in the quest of Jason and the Argonauts; "the Fleece itself, the raison d'être of this entire epic geste, remains a complete [...] mystery. The full reason for its Grail-like desirability [...] is never explained."

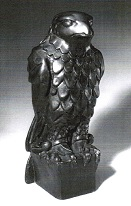
The "Maltese Falcon" statuette from the film of the same name

The World War I–era actress Pearl White used the term "weenie" to identify whatever object (a roll of film, a rare coin, expensive diamonds, etc.) impelled the heroes and villains to pursue each other through the convoluted plots of The Perils of Pauline and the other silent film serials in which she starred. In the 1930 detective novel The Maltese Falcon, a small statuette provides both the book's title and its motive for intrigue.

The name MacGuffin was coined by the English screenwriter Angus MacPhail. It has been posited that "'guff', as a word for anything trivial or worthless, may lie at the root".

=== Alfred Hitchcock ===
Director and producer Alfred Hitchcock popularized the term MacGuffin and the technique with his 1935 film The 39 Steps, in which the MacGuffin is some otherwise incidental military secrets. Hitchcock explained the term MacGuffin in a 1939 lecture at Columbia University in New York City:

It might be a Scottish name, taken from a story about two men on a train. One man says, "What's that package up there in the baggage rack?" And the other answers, "Oh, that's a MacGuffin." The first one asks, "What's a MacGuffin?" "Well," the other man says, "it's an apparatus for trapping lions in the Scottish Highlands." The first man says, "But there are no lions in the Scottish Highlands," and the other one answers, "Well then, that's no MacGuffin!" So you see that a MacGuffin is actually nothing at all.

In a 1966 interview with François Truffaut, Hitchcock explained the term using the same story. He also related this anecdote in a television interview for Richard Schickel's documentary The Men Who Made the Movies, and in an interview with Dick Cavett.

Hitchcock also said, "The MacGuffin is the thing that the spies are after, but the audience doesn't care."

The $40,000 that Marion Crane embezzles at the beginning of Psycho (1960) is sometimes cited as an example of a MacGuffin, in that it doesn't play any further role in the plot.

In Mel Brooks's parody of Hitchcock films, High Anxiety (1977), Brooks's character's hotel room is moved from the 2nd to the 17th floor at the request of "a Mr. MacGuffin", a recognition by name of Hitchcock's use of the device.

=== George Lucas ===
In contrast to Hitchcock's view, Vanity Fair reported that George Lucas "believes that the audience should care about [the MacGuffin] almost as much as the dueling heroes and villains on-screen". Lucas describes R2-D2 as the MacGuffin of the original Star Wars film, and said that the Ark of the Covenant, the titular MacGuffin in Raiders of the Lost Ark, was an excellent example as opposed to the more obscure MacGuffin in Indiana Jones and the Temple of Doom and the "feeble" MacGuffin in Indiana Jones and the Last Crusade. The use of MacGuffins in Indiana Jones films later continued with the titular crystal skull in Kingdom of the Crystal Skull and Archimedes' Dial in the Dial of Destiny.

=== Yves Lavandier ===
Filmmaker and drama writing theorist Yves Lavandier suggests that a MacGuffin is a secret that motivates the villains. North by Northwest's MacGuffin is nothing that motivates the protagonist; Roger Thornhill's objective is to extricate himself from the predicament that the mistaken identity has created, and what matters to Vandamm and the CIA is of little importance to Thornhill. A similar lack of motivating power applies to the MacGuffins of the 1930s films The Lady Vanishes, The 39 Steps, and Foreign Correspondent. In a broader sense, says Lavandier, a MacGuffin denotes any justification for the external conflict in a work.

== Further examples ==
The briefcase in Pulp Fiction (1994) motivates several of the characters during many of the film's major plot points, but its contents are never revealed.

Similarly, the plot of the 1998 film Ronin revolves around a case, the contents of which remain unknown. At the end of the film, it is said to have led to a historic peace agreement and an end to the Troubles in Northern Ireland.

George Lucas also used a MacGuffin in January 1975 in the second draft of Star Wars Episode IV: A New Hope, at that time titled Adventures of the Starkiller, Ep. I: The Star Wars. Biographer Brian Jay Jones wrote that Lucas "decided that the Force could be intensified through the possession of a mystical Kiber Crystal [sic]," which Jones described as "Lucas's first, but by no means last, great MacGuffin". By Lucas's fourth draft, completed January 1, 1976, Jones writes, Lucas "had wisely decided to remove the Kiber Crystal from the story altogether" during the process of "paring down subplots and characters, removing elements that either slowed things down or required too much backstory". Decades later, beginning with Star Wars: The Clone Wars, the franchise reused the term (now spelled "kyber crystal") in a non-MacGuffin context.

A similar usage was employed in John Carpenter's Escape from New York, where the protagonist Snake Plissken is tasked with rescuing both the President of the United States and a cassette tape that will prevent a devastating war between the country and its enemies. While there are hints throughout the film, the contents of the tape are never revealed to the audience.

== See also ==
- Alien space bats
- Big Dumb Object
- The Double McGuffin
- Monomyth
- Red herring
- Schmilblick
- Unobtainium
