= Weenie =

Weenie may refer to:

- A common name for a hot dog
- A slang term for a penis
- A phallic insult, wimp
- A sausage, such as a Vienna sausage or a cocktail weenie
- Weenie Miller (1922–2002), American basketball coach and player
- John "Weenie" Wilson (1914–1968), American football player and high school coach
- The Weenie, an episode of American TV series Lanterns
- Weenie (design), a term used in film and architecture that was popularized by Walt Disney
- Weenie (Oswald), a character from the animated series
- Mr. Weenie, a character from the Open Season franchise

== See also ==
- Weenie Roast, 1931 animated short film
- KROQ Weenie Roast, defunct music festival in Los Angeles
- Weenie Beenie, a fast food restaurant in Arlington County, Virginia
- Weeny Bopper, a 1970s stage name of English singer Rachel Fury
- McWeeny, a surname
- Wiener (disambiguation)
