= Joseph-Theodor Blank =

German politician

Member of the Bundestag
- In office 29 March 1983 – 17 October 2002

Personal details
- Born: 19 March 1947 (age 79) Lüdenscheid, West Germany (now Germany)
- Party: CDU

Joseph-Theodor Blank is a German politician of the Christian Democratic Union (CDU) and former member of the German Bundestag.

== Life ==
Blank was a member of the German Bundestag from 1983 to 2002. He is the nephew of Germany's first Minister of Defence, Theodor Blank, and the son of the German politician Joseph Blank.
