= David B. Weiner =

David B. Weiner is an American Biomedical researcher at The Wistar Institute in Philadelphia, where he serves as executive vice president and director of the Vaccines and Immunotherapy Center. Weiner also holds the titles of WW Smith Distinguished Chair in Cancer research and professor emeritus, Perelman School of Medicine at the University of Pennsylvania.

== Biography ==
Weiner is from Brooklyn, NY, and graduated with a B.S. in biology from SUNY at Stony Brook, NY. He earned both his M.S. in Biology and PhD in development biology from the University of Cincinnati.

Weiner is regarded as one of the founders of the field of DNA vaccines and detailed many of the initial properties of the technology. His laboratory described DNA vaccine technology as an approach to HIV vaccine development and for the immune therapy of cancer, and in 1998, Weiner and his associates were the first to move DNA Vaccines into human clinical trials. The Weiner laboratory also reports on adjuvant effects in vaccination protocols by targeting the checkpoint inhibitor pathways, among others.

Weiner has served as the president of International Society for Vaccines (2018-2020), and as chair of the Gene therapy and Vaccine Training Program at the University of Pennsylvania from 2004 to 2016, before joining the Wistar Institute. He and his lab had a cameo appearance in the 1993 movie Philadelphia starring Tom Hanks.

== Research ==
Weiner's research focuses on translational applications of molecular immunology. His early work developed monoclonal antibodies as therapeutics targeting tumors and infections, and the lab continues to pursue nucleic acid vaccines and immunotherapies. The lab has been involved in several clinical trials.
