= Martin Renner =

German politician (born 1954)

Member of the Bundestag
- Incumbent
- Assumed office 2017

Personal details
- Born: 5 May 1954 (age 72) Reutlingen, West Germany (now Germany)
- Party: AfD

Martin Renner (born 5 May 1954 in Reutlingen, Baden-Württemberg) is a German politician of Alternative for Germany (AfD), previously of CDU. Martin Renner has served as a member of the Bundestag from the state of North Rhine-Westphalia since 2017.

== Life ==
Renner studied Business Administration at Reutlingen University and worked as a marketing director in an international pharmaceutical and cosmetics company and other positions in the cosmetic industry.

Renner was a member of the CDU from 1998 to 2005. In 2012 he joined Bernd Lucke's "Alternative" of which he became the NRW state representative in November 2012 and of which he was a member of the spokesperson's council. At the beginning of 2013 he was one of the 15 founding initiators as well as a member of the founding board of the Alternative für Deutschland party, where he also developed the party name and the logo on behalf of the initiators. Renner organized the founding party conference of the North Rhine-Westphalian state association of the AfD and was elected deputy state spokesman there.

He became member of German Bundestag after the 2017 German federal election. He is a member of the Committee for Culture and Media.

Renner participated in 2015 at an unauthorized demonstration. In December 2017 the Bundestag lifted Renner's immunity in the course of ongoing criminal proceedings.

Renner is author in the right-wing blog Politically Incorrect.
