= Weenie (design) =

Design term popularized by Walt Disney

Sleeping Beauty Castle—which serves as a weenie for Disneyland attendees—pictured in 2008

A weenie (also spelled wienie) is an element of design philosophy popularized by Walt Disney. Applied to both architecture—typified by a major eye-drawing structure like Sleeping Beauty Castle—and visual storytelling—similar to a MacGuffin—a weenie deliberately attracts the attention of audiences to guide their experience.

== Meaning ==
Though it is disputed whether Walt Disney developed the concept originally, he popularized its architectural meaning when building Disneyland. The weenie in an amusement park is generally a central structure that guides patrons toward it, before eventually dispersing them in different directions as crowd control. In the context of Disney parks, Disney described a weenie as saying "to people 'come this way.' People won't go down a long corridor unless there's something promising at the end. You have to have something that beckons to them." John Hench likewise called the weenie "a beckoning finger." In 1991, Walt Disney Imagineering president Marty Sklar identified the creation of weenies as one of the "ten commandments" of good theme park design.

The term developed in film production as a name for the sausages used to train dog actors. In serials and films, it later began to be known in a similar way as the MacGuffin. In this form, Ronald Davidson defined a weenie as "the object of all the mayhem. The weenie can be a map, a document, a mine, an oriental scarab with mystical powers, an invention, or a Nazi plot to gain control of Middle Africa." The coinage of this version of weenie has been credited to silent serials star Pearl White. Derived from the contemporary stage melodramas—where they were called "papahs" in a stylization of "papers"—White's weenie was generally a physical object that audiences could see characters fight over.

== Examples ==
The Sleeping Beauty Castle at the entrance to Fantasyland in Disneyland is regarded as a prime example of the weenie in Disney parks. Other major weenies include Cinderella Castle at Magic Kingdom, a reproduction of Grauman's Chinese Theatre at Disney-MGM Studios, the Tree of Life at Disney's Animal Kingdom, and Spaceship Earth at Epcot. In addition to central structures, objects like a moving paddle-wheel boat can serve as weenies. Some areas of the park are designed intentionally without using nearby landmarks as weenies, so as to create an isolated atmosphere.

Beyond Disney, the Harry Potter and the Escape from Gringotts attraction in Universal Studios Florida is also considered a weenie. The entrance to Universal Studios Beijing runs through a multistory hotel referred to as a weenie. At the Chimelong Ocean Kingdom, a breaching whale shark sculpture serves as a weenie. Marriot built California's Great America and Six Flags Great America both have a two-storey Columbia Carousel as their centrepiece. Kings Entertainment Company built Kings Island and Kings Dominion both have replica Eiffel Towers while Canada's Wonderland has Wonder Mountain.

=== In popular culture ===
The fourth episode of Lanterns is titled "The Weenie". The plot touches on the use of weenies in Disney amusement parks, credited to Walt Disney.
