= Robert Weiner Jr. =

American water polo player (born 1982)

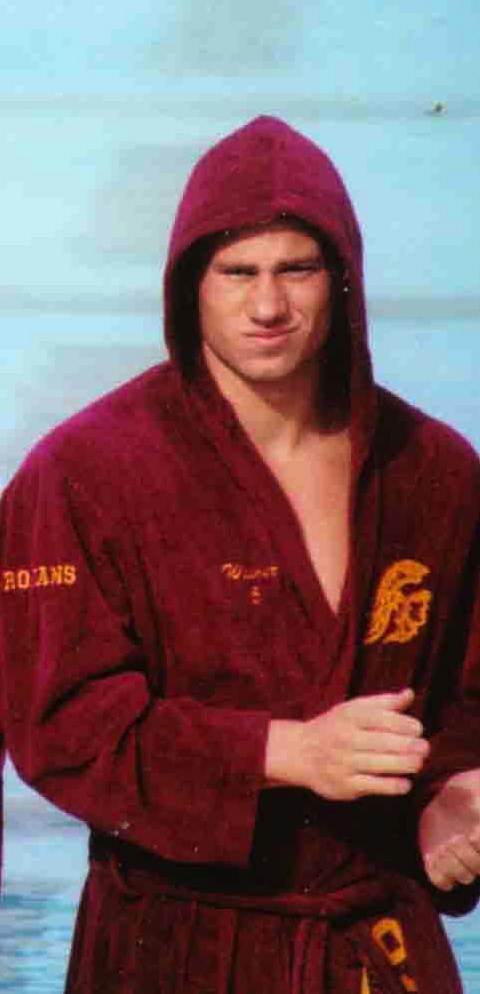
- Robert Weiner at the 2003 NCAA Men's Water Polo Champion

Personal information
- Born: February 22, 1982 (age 44) Newport Beach, California, United States

Sport
- Sport: Water polo

Robert Weiner Jr. (born February 22, 1982) is an international water polo player from the United States, who played for the University of Southern California from 2000 to 2003, and at Newport Harbor High School from 1996 to 1999. As a High School senior he was an All-CIF player leading his team to the CIF Semi Finals and a 24–3 season record.

In 2003, Weiner was a member of the 2003 NCAA Men's Water Polo Championship team. Received 2003 USC Coaches Senior Award. At USC, he majored in International Relations with a minor in Global Communications. In 2014 he graduated with a Masters in Business Administration at USC.

Also played in the Australian National Water Polo League for the UNSW Wests Magpies (2005) and in the Spanish Water Polo League for La Latina in Madrid (2003).

== Notable Water Polo Accomplishments ==
- 2002 - 20 & under National Champion Player with Lamorinda Water Polo Club
- 2003 - NCAA Men's Water Polo Champion - Player
- 2004 - Newport Youth Water Polo - Coach
- 2005 - Wyong Cup Champions UNSW Wests Magpies - Player
- 2006 - Newport Youth Water Polo - Coach
- 2007 - Newport Harbor High School CIF Champions - Assistant
- 2008 & 2009 - Orange Coast College - Coach
- 2015 - Joined Otter Bay Water Polo Foundation - Player/Coach
