= David Weiner (editor) =

News Editor

David Weiner is a Contributing Editor at the Huffington Post. He was formerly the New York Editor and Blog Editor for the site.

As a Huffington Post blogger, Weiner broke the "Recipegate" scandal in which Senator John McCain's wife, Cindy McCain, was found to have plagiarized "family recipes" for the McCain campaign website during the 2008 United States presidential election.

Cindy McCain would later go on The View to defend herself.

In 2009, Weiner and Sarah Greenwalt launched National Fist Bump Day.
