= Hermann Wiener =

German mathematician

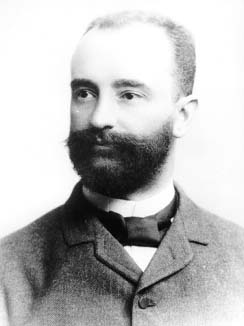
Hermann Wiener

Hermann Ludwig Gustav Wiener (15 May 1857, Karlsruhe – 13 June 1939, Darmstadt) was a German mathematician.

== Education and career ==
Hermann Wiener, whose father was the mathematician Christian Wiener, graduated from the Gymnasium in Karlsruhe. From 1876 to 1879 he studied mathematics and natural science at the Polytechnische Schule Karlsruhe (now the Karlsruhe Institute of Technology). From 1879 to 1882 he studied at the Technical University of Munich under Felix Klein and Alexander von Brill and in 1881 at the University of Leipzig. In 1881 he received his Promotion (PhD) in Munich in mathematics with a thesis Über Involutionen auf ebenen Curven (On involutions on plane curves) under the supervision of Ludwig Seidel. In Karlsruhe in 1882 he passed the state examination for secondary school teachers. He was from 1882 to 1883 a Lehramtspraktikant (teaching trainee) at the Gymnasium in Karlsruhe and from 1882 to 1883 his father's assistant at the Polytechnische Schule Karlsruhe. In 1885 Hermann Wiener habilitated at the Martin Luther University of Halle-Wittenberg with a thesis Rein geometrische Theorie der Darstellung binärer Formen durch Punktgruppen auf der Geraden (Purely geometrical theory of the representation of binary forms by point groups on the line). From 1885 to 1894 he was a Privatdozent at the Martin Luther University of Halle-Wittenberg. In 1894 he was appointed a professor ordinarius at Technische Universität Darmstadt (TU Darmstadt), where he retired as professor emeritus in 1927.

In 1890 Wiener was one of the founders of the German Mathematical Society (Deutsche Mathematiker-Vereinigung, DMV).

Although Wiener is not explicitly credited with influencing Hilbert in his championing of the axiomatic method, it is still worth noting that he gave the talk Über Grundlagen und Aufbau der Geometrie ... to the German Mathematical Society which was published in the first volume of the Jahresberichte der Deutschen Mathematiker vereinigung ... (1892). Wiener proposed that geometry be studied without using visual images, but rather by abstract axiomatic methods. He also joined his father in the creation of mathematical models of geometric surfaces, constructed from plaster and wire.

He was elected in 1895 a member of the German National Academy of Sciences Leopoldina (Deutsche Akademie der Naturforscher Leopoldina) and was appointed in 1907 Geheimer Hofrat (Court Councillor).

== Selected publications ==
- Rein geometrische Theorie der Darstellung binärer Formen. Verlag L. Brill Darmstadt. 1885. (The first part of this work formed Hermann Wiener's habilitation thesis.)
- "Die Zusammensetzung zweier endlichen Schraubungen zu einer einzigen". Ber. Verh. KGL. Sächs. Ges. Wiss. Leipzig. Math.-phys. Cl. 42: 13–23. 1890.
- "Zur Theorie der Umwendungen". Ber. Verh. KGL. Sächs. Ges. Wiss. Leipzig. Math.-phys. Cl. 42: 71–87. 1890. (On the theory of inversions)
- "Über geometrische Analysen". Ber. Verh. KGL. Sächs. Ges. Wiss. Leipzig. Math.-phys. Cl. 42: 245–267. 1890. (On geometric analysis)
- "Über geometrische Analysen. Fortsetzung". Ber. Verh. KGL. Sächs. Ges. Wiss. Leipzig. Math.-phys. Cl. 43: 424–447. 1891. (On geometric analysis. Confirmation)
- "Über die aus zwei Spiegelungen zusammengesetzten Verwandtschaften". Ber. Verh. KGL. Sächs. Ges. Wiss. Leipzig. Math.-phys. Cl. 43: 644–673. 1891.
- "Über Gruppen vertauschbarer zweispiegeliger Verwandtschaften". Ber. Verh. KGL. Sächs. Ges. Wiss. Leipzig. Math.-phys. Cl. 45: 555–598. 1893.
- Sechs Abhandlungen über das Rechnen mit Spiegelungen, nebst Anwendungen auf die Geometrie der Bewegungen und auf die Projektile Geometrie. Leipzig: Breitkopf & Härtel. 1893. (Six treatises on calculating with reflections, along with applications on the geometry of movements and on projective geometry; book consisting of reprints of six papers published from 1890 to 1893)
- "Über Grundlagen und Aufbau der Geometrie". Jahresber. DMV. 1: 45–48. 1892. (identical text in: "Über Grundlagen und Aufbau der Geometrie". Verh. Ges. Dtsch. Naturf. U. Ärzte. 62, zweiter Teil: 8–9. 1892.
- "Weiteres über Grundlagen und Aufbau der Geometrie". Jahresber. DMV. 3: 70–80. 1894. (More on the foundations and structure of geometry)
- Die Einteilung der ebenen Kurven und Kegel dritter Ordnung. Verlag M. Schilling Halle a. S. 1901. (The classification of plane curves and cones of third order)
