= Robert S. Weiner =

American political pundit

Robert S. "Bob" Weiner (born April 3, 1947) is a newspaper columnist, American Democratic strategist and political commentator. Mr. Weiner served as campaign aide to Massachusetts Senator Edward M. Kennedy, chief of staff for the United States House Permanent Select Committee on Aging under Florida Congressman Claude Pepper, as well as a White House Chief of Press Relations and Director of Public Affairs during the Clinton and Bush administrations. He is president of the Maryland-based public relations firm Robert Weiner Associates and the founder and board member of the MD nonprofit group Solutions for Change. Weiner is best known for his progressive editorial articles, published in newspapers across the country, in which he addresses contemporary American public policy from a center-left position. He is married to Dr. Patricia Berg.

== Education ==
Mr. Weiner obtained his BA from Oberlin College in 1969 and his MA in recent American history from the University of Massachusetts Amherst in 1974.

He was a member of the Oberlin Student Cooperative Association, of which he was elected Treasurer.

== Early political career ==
=== Watergate era ===
In 1970, he volunteered as the Western Massachusetts Student Co-coordinator for Senator Edward Kennedy. After ratification of the 26th Amendment in 1971, which lowered the voting age in the United States from 21 to 18, he took a job as the first National Youth Voter Registration Coordinator at the Democratic National Committee, headquartered in the Watergate office building. In 1972, he began work as national youth voter registration media coordinator for the Democrats' Get-out-the-Vote campaign, also headquartered at the Watergate.

=== Age discrimination ===
Weiner served as chief of staff for the U.S. House of Representatives Select Committee on Aging from 1976 to 1980, under Chairman Claude Pepper. His work during this time focused on protecting Social Security and Medicare and enacting of Age Discrimination in Employment Act Amendments in 1978, which abolished mandatory retirement age at age 65.

== 1980s through 2000s ==
From 1987 through 1990, Mr. Weiner served as press secretary and media coordinator for the U.S. House of Representatives Select Committee on Narcotics under Congressman Charles Rangel. From 1990 through 1995, he was the press secretary and communications director on the U.S. House of Representatives Committee on Government Operations and National Security Subcommittee, chaired by Congressman John Conyers. From May 1995 until August 2001, Mr. Weiner served as chief of press relations and director of public affairs for the White House Office of Drug Policy.

During the Monica Lewinsky scandal, Weiner was subpoenaed to testify before the Whitewater-Lewinsky grand jury by independent council Kenneth Starr. Starr cited Weiner's work as a White House spokesman at the time to justify his subpoena; however it was later revealed that Starr was motivated by Weiner's comments to a friend concerning the legality of Linda Tripp's secret recording of private phone calls with Monica Lewinsky, a felony in the state of Maryland. Upon exiting the courthouse, Weiner is quoted as saying "this is an incredible overreach by the prosecutor to have subpoenaed us. It is Big Brother at its worst and it really scares you."

=== Drug policy ===
Though Weiner is progressive on most issues, he is conservative on drug issues, reflecting his six years at the Office of National Drug Control Policy and five years working with the House Narcotics Committee. He has been interviewed frequently on drug policy issue on CNN's Crossfire, Bill Maher's Politically Incorrect, and on other television and radio programs and in print media.
