= Christian Wiener =

German mathematician

- Born: 7 December 1826; Darmstadt, Germany
- Died: 31 July 1896 (aged 69); Karlsruhe, Germany
- Education: University of Giessen
- Known for: Brownian motion
- Scientific career
- Fields: Mathematics
- Workplaces: Karlsruhe Institute of Technology

Ludwig Christian Wiener (7 December 1826 Darmstadt – 31 July 1896 Karlsruhe) was a German mathematician who specialized in descriptive geometry. Wiener was also a physicist and philosopher. In 1863, he was the first person to identify qualitatively the internal molecular cause of Brownian motion.

Wiener was the son of a judge and studied architecture and engineering in Giessen. After the state examination in 1848, he became a teacher at the "Höhere Gewerbeschule" in Darmstadt, today the Technische Universität Darmstadt.

The mathematician Hermann Wiener was his son.

== Selected publications ==
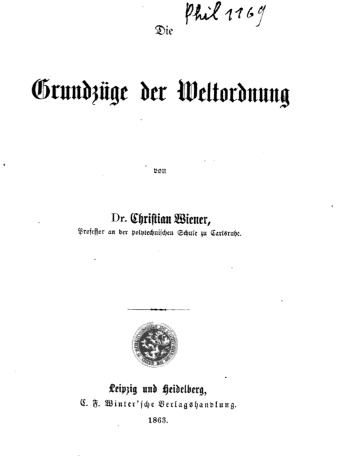

- Lehrbuch der darstellenden Geometrie, 2 Bände, Teubner, Leipzig 1884, 1887, online at archiv.org: ,
- Die ersten Sätze der Erkenntniß, insbesondere das Gesetz der Ursächlichkeit und die Wirklichkeit der Außenwelt, Berlin, Lüderitz 1874
- Die Freiheit des Willens, Darmstadt, Brill 1894
- Die Grundzüge der Weltordnung, Leipzig, Winter 1863,
- Über Vielecke und Vielflache, Teubner 1864
