= Weiner (disambiguation) =

Weiner is a surname of German origin.

Weiner may also refer to:

- Weiner, Arkansas, a city
- Weiner's, an American clothing retailer
- Weiner (film), a documentary about Anthony Weiner, an American politician

== See also ==
- Wiener (disambiguation)
