= Richard Weiner (American author) =

Richard Weiner (May 10, 1927 – January 29, 2014) was an American author, lecturer, lexicographer, and public relations consultant.

== Life and work ==
Weiner was born in New York City on May 10, 1927. He received B.S. and M.S. degrees from the University of Wisconsin. A science writer and broadcaster, he produced the first radio description of a human childbirth (distributed by Capitol Records). He was on the board of directors of the Medical Committee for Human Rights, American Academy on Physician and Patient, Medicare Rights Center, and Shake-A-Leg Miami.

His public relations firm, Richard Weiner, Inc. (1968–1986), specialized in marketing communications, including the introduction of the Cabbage Patch Kids. Weiner has conducted over 100 workshops for the Public Relations Society of America and other groups. He taught a three-credit course in public relations at Fordham University Graduate School of Business Administration in New York, which was the nation's first such course for MBAs. Awards Weiner has received include the Gold Anvil in 1990 (highest honor to an individual from the Public Relations Society of America), the John Hill Award (NYC chapter of PRSA), and eight PRSA Silver Anvils.

His 23 books include The Skinny About Best Boys, Dollies, Green Rooms, Leads, and other Media Lingo (2006), Webster's New World Dictionary of Media and Communications (1996), Professional's Guide to Public Relations Services (1998), and Professional's Guide to Publicity (1984). His articles have appeared in The New York Times Magazine, Writer's Digest, Public Relations Tactics, The Editorial Eye, Public Relations Quarterly, Communication World, PRWeek and PR News.

== Personal life ==
Weiner lived in Miami Beach, Florida, with his wife, Florence, who is also a writer of books.
