= Klaus Wiener =

German politician

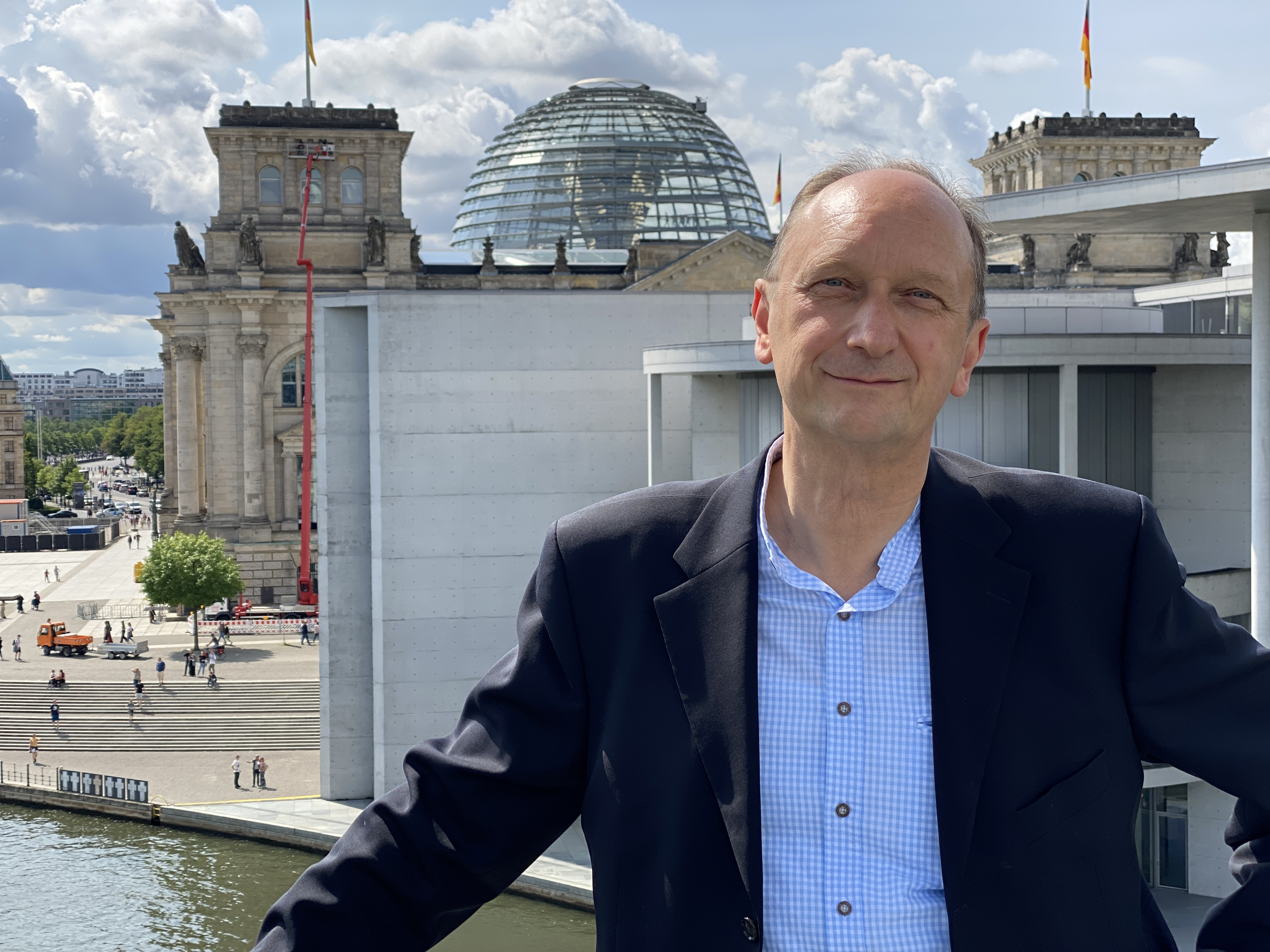

Member of the Bundestag
- Incumbent
- Assumed office 2021

Personal details
- Born: 21 August 1962 (age 64) Nordhorn, West Germany
- Citizenship: German
- Party: German: CDU; EU: European People's Party
- Education: Osnabrück University

Klaus Wiener (born 21 August 1962) is a German economist and politician of the Christian Democratic Union (CDU) who has been serving as a member of the Bundestag since 2021, representing the Mettmann I district. He previously held positions as economist for the German Insurance Association (GDV), Generali, WestLB and Commerzbank.

== Early life and education ==
Wiener was born 1962 in the West German town of Nordhorn and studied economics.

== Political career ==
Wiener joined the CDU in 2005.

Wiener was directly elected to the Bundestag in 2021 for Mettmann. In parliament, he has since been serving on the Committee on the Environment, Nature Conservation, Nuclear Safety and Consumer Protection.

== Other activities ==
- Nuclear Waste Disposal Fund (KENFO), Member of the Board of Trustees (since 2022)
