= Nina Wiener (dancer) =

American dancer and choreographer

Nina Wiener (Note: Listed as Nina Weiner in The Biographical Dictionary of Dance, 1982 and some other sources.) is an American avant-garde dancer and choreographer.

== Biography ==
Nina Wiener was born in New York City and grew up in Arizona and southern California. She studied modern dance with Lester Horton and trained in ballet. She came back to New york in 1969 and studied with Merce Cunningham. She began her dancing career with Twyla Tharp's Twyla Tharp Dance company in 1973. She left Twyla Tharp's due to an injury and gave classes at the Ohio State University. In 1976 she started her own company, Nina Wiener and Dancers. Anna Kisselgoff described it as "an elegant haughty-looking experimental dance troupe focused on brainy choreography". In late 1980s – early 1990s she was also an artistic adviser for the Dutch dance company Reflex.

Wiener has studied with Bella Lewitzky, Merce Cunningham, Paul Taylor, Alvin Ailey, the Martha Graham company, Leon Danielian, and George Balanchine. In 1982 Nina Wiener was among young choreographers selected by Mikhail Baryshnikov to create her dance in a workshop with American Ballet Theatre's junior company. She presented her works, Time to Go and Lullabies for Elisabeth (on the score by Sergio Cervetti).

== Notable works ==
- Integers (1980)
- Wind Devil (1983)
- In Closed Time (1985), described by Martin Bernheimer as "an engaging and confusing three-act modern-abstract-narrative quasi-psychoballet "
- Fierce Attachments (1987)
- Transatlantic Light (1987)
- Harmonic Landscapes (1990)
