= Wiener =

Wiener (from German: "Viennese") may refer to:

== Food ==
- A Vienna sausage of German origin, in German Wiener, named after the capital of Austria
- A hot dog, a cooked sausage, traditionally grilled or steamed and served in a sliced bun
- A Polish sausage (kielbasa) or "wenar"

== People ==
- Wiener (surname)

== Places ==
- Wiener Neudorf, a town in the eastern part of the Mödling district, Austria
- Wiener Neustadt, a town south of Vienna, in the state of Lower Austria, Austria
- Wiener Stadthalle, an indoor arena, in Vienna, Austria
- Wiener Staatsoper, the Vienna State Opera

== Other uses ==
- The Wiener AC, also known as Wiener AC or WAC, an Austrian sports club in Vienna
- Wiener process, a mathematical model related to Brownian motion
- Wiener equation, named after Norbert Wiener, assumes the current velocity of a fluid particle fluctuates randomly
- Wiener sausage, a mathematical concept related to the above
- Wiener filter, a noise filter used in signal processing
- Wiener (crater), a crater on the far side of the Moon
- Wiener (magazine), an Austrian men's magazine
- Wiener dog, colloquial term for dachshund
- Wieners (film), a 2008 American film
- Slang term for penis

== See also ==
- Weiner (disambiguation)
- Weenie (disambiguation)
