= List of New Zealand musicians =

This is a list of New Zealand musicians of any genre.

See also the categories:

- New Zealand musical groups
- New Zealand musicians
- New Zealand songwriters

== 0-9 ==
- 1814
- 3 The Hard Way – hip-hop band; "Hip Hop Holiday" (1994) reached #1
- The 3Ds
- 48May
- 8 Foot Sativa

== A ==
- Aaradhna
- Able Tasmans
- Chris Abrahams
- Richard Adams
- Adeaze
- Rudy Adrian
- Age Pryor
- The Fan Club
- Alien Weaponry
- Steve Allen
- Anderson and Wise
- Annah Mac
- Antagonist A.D.
- Ardijah
- Atlas
- Autozamm
- Avalanche City

== B ==
- Bailter Space
- Balu Brigada
- Bang Bang Eche
- Christopher Banks
- The Bats
- Beastwars
- Beat Rhythm Fashion
- Daniel Bedingfield
- Benee
- Betchadupa
- The Beths
- Carly Binding
- Birchville Cat Motel
- The Birds
- Bird Nest Roys
- Black River Drive
- The Black Seeds
- Blacklistt
- Ginny Blackmore – singer-songwriter
- Blam Blam Blam
- Bleeders
- Blerta
- Blindspott
- Jack Body – composer
- Kevin Borich
- Boyband
- John Christopher Bradshaw
- Graham Brazier
- Breaks Co-Op
- Breathe
- Jonathan Bree
- Bressa Creeting Cake
- Bridgette Allen
- Broods
- The Brunettes
- Rosina Buckman – opera singer
- Richard James Burgess – drummer
- Bulldogs Allstar Goodtime Band

== C ==
- The Cakekitchen
- Edwin Carr
- Shayne Carter
- Cassandra's Ears
- Che Fu
- The Checks
- The Chicks
- The Chills
- Clap Clap Riot
- Jemaine Clement – member of folk/pop/comedy duo Flight of the Conchords
- Darcy Clay
- The Clean
- Chanel Cole
- Coconut Rough
- Confessor
- Ray Columbus – Invaders singer, TV presenter
- Concord Dawn
- Ashley Cooper
- Crowded House
- Annie Crummer
- Cut Off Your Hands

== D ==
- The D4
- David Dallas
- Maria Dallas
- Dam Native
- Dance Exponents
- Dartz
- The Datsuns
- Mark de Clive-Lowe
- Julia Deans
- Delaney Davidson
- Dawn of Azazel
- DD Smash
- Leo De Castro
- The Dead C
- Dead Famous People
- Deep Obsession
- Dei Hamo
- Deja Voodoo
- Demoniac
- Devilskin
- Johnny Devlin
- Lynette Diaz
- Die! Die! Die!
- Dimmer
- Bill Direen (Bilderine)
- Disasteradio
- DLT (Darryl Thomson)
- Dave Dobbyn – singer-songwriter
- The DoubleHappys
- Graeme Downes
- Dr Kevorkian & the Suicide Machine
- Dragon
- Drax Project
- Dribbling Darts
- Brooke Duff
- The Dukes

== E ==
- Electric Confectionaires
- Elemeno P
- The Enemy
- The Enright House
- Evermore
- The Exponents
- Eye TV

== F ==
- Andrew Fagan
- The Fan Club
- David Farquhar – composer
- Fast Crew
- Fat Freddy's Drop
- Annabel Fay
- Fazerdaze
- The Feelers
- Liam Finn
- Neil Finn – singer-songwriter
- Tim Finn – singer-songwriter
- Flight of the Conchords
- Fly My Pretties
- Foamy Ed
- The Fourmyula
- Brooke Fraser
- Fred Dagg (John Clarke)
- From Scratch
- The Front Lawn
- Frontline
- Ruby Frost
- Fur Patrol
- Futurians

== G ==
- Garageland
- David and Dale Garratt
- Steve Gilpin
- Golden Harvest
- Goldenhorse
- Goodnight Nurse
- Goodshirt
- GST

== H ==
- Nathan Haines
- Ria Hall
- Mika Haka
- Hallelujah Picassos
- Joan Hammond – violinist, soprano
- Hammond Gamble
- John Hanlon
- Aldous Harding
- Headband
- Headless Chickens
- Hello Sailor
- Jan Hellriegel
- George D. Henderson
- Herbs
- Herriot Row
- High Dependency Unit
- Head Like A Hole
- Hogsnort Rupert
- Home Brew
- Calum Hood – from Australian band 5 Seconds of Summer
- Horomona Horo
- House of Downtown
- House of Shem
- Howard Morrison Quartet
- Fanny Howie
- Al Hunter
- Marc Hunter – singer (moved to Australia)
- Human
- Human Instinct
- Luke Hurley

== I ==
- I Am Giant
- In Dread Response
- Ivy Lies

== J ==
- J.Williams (Joshua Williams) – singer, dancer
- Jakob
- Billy T. James
- Mitch James
- Jean-Paul Sartre Experience
- Peter Jefferies
- Jennie – singer and member of Blackpink (lived in New Zealand for some years)
- Greg Johnson
- Phil Joel – former bassist of the Newsboys

== K ==
- K'Lee
- K.One
- Katchafire
- KERI
- Kerretta
- Kids of 88
- Kidz in Space
- Alphonso Keil
- Eliza Keil
- Freddie Keil
- Herma Keil
- Olaf Keil
- David Kilgour
- Kimbra
- Kimo
- Ken Kincaid
- King Kapisi
- Knightshade
- The Knobz
- Chris Knox
- Kora
- Kraus

== L ==
- L.A.B.
- The La De Da's
- Ladi6
- Ladyhawke
- Shona Laing
- Larry's Rebels
- Dinah Lee
- Leisure (band)
- Like A Storm
- Douglas Lilburn – composer, educator
- Jody Lloyd
- Look Blue Go Purple
- Lorde
- Eddie Low
- Low Profile
- Jordan Luck
- Luger Boa
- Ben Lummis
- Bruce Lynch
- Suzanne Lynch

== M ==
- Tim Maddren
- Malvina Major – opera singer
- Moana Maree Maniapoto
- Midge Marsden
- Dennis Marsh
- Elizabeth Marvelly
- Massad
- Renee Maurice – singer, musical playwright
- Ma-V-Elle
- Ricky May
- Dave McArtney
- Jamie McDell
- John McGough
- Bret McKenzie – member of folk/pop/comedy duo Flight of the Conchords
- Ryan McPhun and the Ruby Suns
- Merekotia Amohau
- Max Merritt
- Bruno Merz
- Metal Fusion
- Midnight Youth
- The Midnights
- Mild Orange
- Minuit
- The Mint Chicks
- Mi-Sex
- Misfits of Science
- Anika Moa
- Moana and the Moahunters (also known as Moana and the Tribe)
- Connan Mockasin
- The Mockers
- Monte Video and the Cassettes
- Roy Montgomery
- Willy Moon
- Moorhouse
- Jenny Morris – singer-songwriter
- Sir Howard Morrison – entertainer
- Mother Goose
- Motocade
- Mt Eden (formerly Mt Eden Dubstep)
- Mumsdollar
- Muroki
- Michael Murphy
- Warwick Murray
- The Mutton Birds
- MOKOTRON

== N ==
- The Naked and Famous
- The Narcs
- Nash Chase
- Oscar Natzka – opera singer
- Tami Neilson
- Nesian Mystik
- Netherworld Dancing Toys
- Ngaire
- Mike Nock
- Nocturnal Projections
- Nurture

== O ==
- OMC
- Sharon O'Neill
- Simon O'Neill – opera singer
- Openside
- Opensouls
- Opshop

== P ==
- Emma Paki
- Parachute Band
- Rosy Parlane
- Parmentier
- Pātea Māori Club
- Suzanne Paul
- Payola
- Peking Man
- Abe Phillips
- The Phoenix Foundation
- Pitch Black
- Pluto
- P-Money
- The Politicians
- Pop Mechanix
- Peter Posa
- Suzanne Prentice
- Anita Prime
- Dalvanius Prime
- Prince Tui Teka
- Princess Chelsea
- The Puddle
- Push Push

== R ==
- The Rabble
- The Radars
- John Rae (musician)
- Randa
- Rapture Ruckus
- Nadia Reid
- The Renderers
- Jordan Reyne
- Don Richardson
- The Rising Stars
- Dean Roberts
- Rosé – singer and member of Blackpink (was born and lived in New Zealand until at the age of 7)
- John Rowles – singer
- Rubicon
- The Ruby Suns
- Mike Rudd
- Dane Rumble
- The Rumour
- Bic Runga
- Bruce Russell

== S ==
- Salmonella Dub
- Satellite Spies
- Savage
- Craig Scott
- Screaming Meemees
- Scribe
- The Shadracks
- Shapeshifter
- Rhian Sheehan
- Shepherds Reign
- Shihad – also known as Pacifier
- Shocking Pinks
- Shoes This High
- The Simple Image
- Sinate
- Sisters Underground
- Six60
- SJD
- Skallander
- The Skeptics
- Slim
- Smashproof
- Snapper
- Sneaky Feelings
- Southside of Bombay
- Space Waltz
- Spacifix
- Split Enz
- Nigel Stanford
- Stellar*
- The Stereo Bus
- Steriogram
- Frankie Stevens
- Jon Stevens
- Straitjacket Fits
- Strawpeople
- Strike
- Suburban Reptiles
- Superette
- Supergroove
- Surf City
- The Swingers

== T ==
- Tiki Taane
- Tadpole
- Tahuna Breaks
- Tall Dwarfs
- Dame Kiri Te Kanawa – opera singer
- Inia Te Wiata – opera singer
- Th' Dudes
- This Kind of Punishment
- Theia (singer)
- The Tigers
- Tiny Ruins
- Benny Tipene
- Aaron Tokona – also known as AHoriBuzz
- Tomorrow People
- Jon Toogood – lead singer of the band Shihad
- Topp Twins
- Toy Love
- TrinityRoots
- TrueBliss
- Truth
- The Tutts
- Two Lane Blacktop

== U ==
- Ulcerate
- Unity Pacific
- Unknown Mortal Orchestra
- Upper Hutt Posse
- Margaret Urlich

== V ==
- Rosita Vai
- Peter van der Fluit
- The Veils
- The Verlaines
- Vayne
- Villainy
- Voom

== W ==
- Miho Wada – jazz flautist and saxophonist, founder of Miho's Jazz Orchestra
- Stan Walker
- Bunny Walters
- Dean Wareham – singer and guitarist with Galaxie 500, Luna and Dean & Britta
- The Warratahs
- Darren Watson
- Waves
- Hayley Westenra – singer
- Weta
- When the Cat's Away
- Annie Whittle
- Gin Wigmore
- Pere Wihongi
- Marlon Williams
- Pixie Williams – singer
- Martin Winch – guitarist
- Working With Walt
- Dion Workman
- Wreck Small Speakers On Expensive Stereos

== Y ==
- The Yandall Sisters
- Yulia
- Yumi Zouma

== Z ==
- Zed
- Zowie
