= Failsafe Records =

New Zealand record label

Failsafe Records is a New Zealand record label with a decades-long association to the Christchurch music scene. It started a long line of releases, including a chain of compilations that featured many artists (notably JPSE, Double Happys, Nocturnal Projections and Loves Ugly Children) who later appeared on Flying Nun Records, major labels, or other larger indies.

== History ==
Failsafe was started by Rob Mayes in 1983, in response to the lack of access to recordings and releases of the bands who were playing at Christchurch venues. "I'm not trying to make a million dollars, I'm just trying to preserve art," he told Rip it Up in 1993.

The label had a big upsurge in the early 1990s with the release of its Avalanche Compilation featuring Loves Ugly Children alongside Pumpkinhead, 147Swordfish (featuring two members of Salmonella Dub and David Wernhan who went on to sculpt live sounds for Shihad and S Dub), Lurch and Supertanker. The label also released work by Christchurch moody pop band Throw, Malchicks and Squirm, and its genre encompassed indie guitar disc Good Things.

In 1995, the label went into hibernation before resurfacing in 2001 with releases from Degrees K, Substandard, Eskimo (now Kimo) and Hooster before launching in 2005 its Retrogenic Series of retrospective releases focusing on key overlooked bands from the past 25 years. Wave 2 of the Retrogenic Series is scheduled for 2008. The label continues to work as a completely independent label and distributor.

The Label has consistently released new recorded works including recordings for Beat Rhythm Fashion, Springloader, Haiku Redo, Orangefarm, Supertanker, Crash, and YFC, as well as continuing its collected works series with deluxe remastered and expanded albums for Mainly Spaniards, The Lils, Breathing Cage, Atomic Blossom, Eight Living Legs, and Throw.

In 2007 the label collated a collection of iconic proto dream pop band Beat Rhythm Fashion encompassing the bands three singles including their opus Turn of the Century. This song went on to build ever increasing traction being noted by artists such as Beach House in their reddit curated playlist, and being covered by brooklyn band Nation of Language which sent a wave of thousands of new listeners to the band. Failsafe delivered a further 3 discs for Beat Rhythm Fashion including Tenterhook, an album of new material, Beings Rest Finally collecting the bands early work on the Four Stars compilation and 2024's Critical Mass which entered the New Zealand Albums charts at number 5, and the international Charts at number 37.

The label followed this up with an album by Christchurch indiegaze artist Springloader which delivered their debut album Just Like Yesterday, almost breaking the world record for longest time to record an album clocking in at 31 years. The Record was 32 years set by David Axelrod.

A series of singles and an album Disco Summer was released in early 2025 by Auckland NZ artist Haiku Redo.

=== Retrogenic Series ===
The Retrogenic Series is a group of CD releases from the Failsafe Records. The initial imprint started in 2005 as part of Failsafe's 30 albums in 30 days project, an attempt to release one album a day for the month of May 2005, and attempt to clear the Failsafe Records archives of collected works at that time unavailable to the greater public.

This mostly consisted of music from important New Zealand post punk and alternative bands from the early 1980s to the 1990s such as Children's Hour, Eight Living Legs, YFC, Evasive Action, Southern Front, Newtones, Andriodss, Beat Rhythm Fashion, Pop Mechanix and Breathing Cage.

Many of these bands had sporadic recording works that were often left unreleased and unavailable to the public due to the lack of record labels willing to put money into financing local releases in New Zealand at the time, and the prohibitive cost to bands of undertaking pressings themselves.

The Retrogenic Series aims to collect, restore and master as much material as can be found by various important and under represented artists from the acknowledged well spring of innovation that happened in the 1977-late 1980s period that spawned the Flying Nun Records, Propeller Records and Ripper Records labels, along with Failsafe which started in 1983.

After the first wave of releases in 2005, the label continues to add new releases to the series as time and newly surfaced material allows. The project has continued and has taken 'requests' from music fans for artists they felt appropriate to the series.

== See also ==
- List of record labels
- List of New Zealand record labels
- Music of New Zealand
