= David Garrett (disambiguation) =

David Garrett may refer to:

- David Garrett (born 1980), German pop and crossover violinist and recording artist
  - David Garrett (album), 2009
- David C. Garrett, Jr. (1922–2012), American businessman who was CEO of Delta Air Lines 1978–1987
- David Garrett (politician) (born 1958), New Zealand lawyer and politician
- David Garrett (screen writer) (active from 2005), American filmmaker

== See also ==
- David Garratt, founder of Scripture in Song
