= Gary Sullivan =

Gary Sullivan may refer to:

- Gary Sullivan (engineer), American electrical engineer that led the development of international video and image coding standards
- Gary Sullivan (poet), American poet credited with coining the term "Flarf poetry", and writing early examples of the genre
- Gary Sullivan (radio host), American radio host of a home improvement talk radio program
- Gary Sullivan (rugby league), Australian rugby league footballer of the 1960s and 1970s
- Gary Sullivan (soccer) (born 1982), American soccer player for the Long Island Rough Riders and Colorado Rapids
- Gary Sullivan, the New Zealand drummer who has played with Dimmer, JPSE, Chug, The Adults and The Stereo Bus
- Gary Sullivan (restaurateur), Boston restaurateur

== See also ==
- At Home with Gary Sullivan
