= John McGough =

John McGough may refer to:

- John McGough (athlete), Scottish athlete
- John McGough (musician), New Zealand musician and entertainer
- John F. McGough, American football player and coach of football, basketball, and baseball
