= Forced to Fight =

Forced to Fight may refer to:

- Bloodfist III: Forced to Fight, 1992 film
- 1944: Forced to Fight, 2015 film directed by Elmo Nüganen
- Forced to Fight, 2011 film directed by Jonas Quastel and starring Gary Daniels and Peter Weller
- "Force To Fight", song by Capital Theatre
