= Down at the End of the Garden =

2001 album by Cloudboy

Studio album by Cloudboy
- Released: April 2001
- Genre: Dream pop
- Length: 56:27
- Labels: Arclife Records; Loop Records
- Producer: Cloudboy

Cloudboy chronology
Cloudboy (1995)	Down at the End of the Garden (2001)

Down at the End of the Garden is the debut studio album by New Zealand band Cloudboy, released in April 2001.

== Production ==
Lead vocalist Demarnia Lloyd of the band Mink first worked on Cloudboy as a side project in 1995, releasing a seven-track extended play. Work began on Down at the End of the Garden in 1997, while Lloyd continued to be an active member of Mink. When Mink disbanded in 1999, Lloyd relocated from Dunedin to Wellington to finish recording the album.

The record was created by Craig Monk, Demarnia Lloyd of Mink and Johannes Contag of the band the Golden Awesome, and was recorded at home studios. The band felt free to experiment with new home studio technology, and attempted to create lush soundscapes to frame Lloyd's voice in compelling and unusual ways, while avoiding established genre sounds. The album is in part inspired by the serenity Lloyd felt among the hills above Wellington.

== Release and promotion ==
The album was released in April 2001, through Arclife in the South Island and Loop in the North Island.

Cloudboy held three performances at the BATS Theatre in March and April 2001 to celebrate the release of the album. After the album saw increased sales and radio play during the bNet NZ Music Week, the band returned to Wellington to perform a one-off show at the Paramount Theatre on 20 May. This was followed by a European tour in September. The band planned to create a remix album based on the tracks of Down at the End of the Garden to gain entry into the world of dance music, but this project never eventuated.

On 22 April 2023, the album was re-released with a revised track listing for Record Store Day through Flying Nun Records. A remastered version of the music video for "(You're So) Pretty" was released a week earlier on 14 April.

== Critical reception ==
Russell Baillie of The New Zealand Herald gave the album four stars out of five, describing Down at the End of the Garden as "an album of foggy atmospheres infused with beguiling melodies care of the breathy vocals of frontwoman Demarnia Lloyd", praising the album as "imaginative pop of just-so poise with a hint of darkness". Russell and Graham Reid from The New Zealand Herald rated it number 12 on their list of top 20 albums of the year.

== Track listing ==
All tracks are written by Demarnia Lloyd.

Down at the End of the Garden track listing
No.	Title	Length
1.	"Teaboy"	4:06
2.	"Red Rubicon"	3:36
3.	"Cup of Roses"	4:17
4.	"Tae K (Playground Mix)"	0:53
5.	"(You're So) Pretty"	4:04
6.	"Feudal"	5:57
7.	"Ahoy"	4:10
8.	"Tebo"	5:29
9.	"Walk Along (Promenade Mix)"	2:03
10.	"Daydreamland"	4:01
11.	"Humm"	1:02
12.	"The Play"	4:52
13.	"(Brimea) Pretty"	4:23
14.	"This Long Underwater"	5:14
15.	"No Room Between"	3:20
Total length:		56:27

Down at the End of the Garden 20th Anniversary reissue track listing
No.	Title	Length
1.	"Teaboy"	4:05
2.	"Red Rubicon"	3:38
3.	"Cup of Roses"	4:18
4.	"Tae K (Playground Mix)"	1:03
5.	"(You're So) Pretty"	4:03
6.	"Feudal"	5:59
7.	"Humm"	1:03
8.	"Ahoy"	4:15
9.	"Tebo"	5:30
10.	"Walk Along (Promenade Mix)"	2:02
11.	"(Brimea) Pretty"	4:23
12.	"This Long Underwater"	5:15
13.	"No Room Between"	3:17
Total length:		49:00

== Credits and personnel ==
- Johannes Contag – arranger, mixing, recording
- Demarnia Lloyd – arranger, recording, writing, vocals
- Craig Monk – arranger, recording
- Heath Te Au – recording

== Charts ==
Chart performance for Down at the End of the Garden
Chart (2023)	Peak position
New Zealand Artist Albums (RMNZ)	3

== Release history ==
Release dates and formats for Down at the End of the Garden
Region	Date	Format(s)	Label(s)	Ref.
New Zealand	April 2001	CD	Arclife; Loop	
Various	22 April 2023	Vinyl; digital download; streaming	Flying Nun Records	
