= David Mulcahy =

David Mulcahy may refer to:

- David Mulcahy (guitarist), New Zealand guitarist formerly of Jean-Paul Sartre Experience
- David Mulcahy (drummer), English drummer from band Razorlight
