= Paul Reid (actor) =

New Zealand actor and musician

Paul Andrew Reid (born 1980 or 1981) is a New Zealand actor, musician and property developer. He played Marshall Heywood on the long-running soap opera Shortland Street from 2001 to 2004, and was also a member of the band Rubicon. He now owns a commercial property investment company in Auckland and is the drummer for Auckland-based rock band Capital Theatre.

He has also been involved in large-scale property acquisitions that have attracted media attention, including a 2024 purchase of approximately 30 Christchurch houses that resulted in tenants receiving 90-day notices shortly before Christmas.

== Biography ==
Born in 1980 or 1981, Reid was educated at Linwood College in Christchurch, where he took part in some school stage productions. He joined Christchurch rock group Loves Ugly Children as drummer in 1997, and not long they toured Australia before moving to Auckland. The group broke up in 1998, but Reid remained in Auckland to pursue an acting career. He eventually secured the role of Marshall Heywood in the long-running soap opera Shortland Street, after Reid's band, Rubicon, played a band in the Disney Channel film Zenon: The Zequel, which was shot in Auckland.

In 1999, Reid (lead vocals and drummer) formed pop group Rubicon with Gene Bennett (guitar) and John Corker (bass). Reid took a break from Shortland Street in 2002, when his character was sent to a juvenile detention centre, during which time Rubicon recorded their debut album, "Primary", released in August that year. In February 2003, Rubicon headlined the Summer Hummer concerts at the Invercargill Showgrounds and Jade Stadium in Christchurch, alongside Goodshirt and K'Lee.

Outside of Shortland Street, Reid acted on stage, including a summer season of Christchurch's Shakespeare in the Park.

Reid left Shortland Street in 2004, and moved to Los Angeles to concentrate on music.

== Legal issues ==
In July 2008, Reid was charged with assault, following an alleged altercation with a taxi driver in Auckland. According to reporting by the Sunday News, the driver sustained a cut above his eye and bruising around his eye and cheek. Reid appeared briefly in court, was granted bail, and was scheduled for a later status hearing. Speaking to the newspaper after his initial appearance, Reid said he could not comment while the matter was before the courts and stated, “Honestly, I’m not guilty.”

In February 2012, Reid was charged with drink-driving following a crash in central Auckland. According to The New Zealand Herald, his BMW convertible struck a parked car on Lorne Street and left the scene. Reid returned a blood-alcohol level of 214 mg per 100 ml of blood, more than twice the legal limit, and was summonsed to appear in the North Shore District Court.

== Property development and tenant evictions ==
In 2009, Reid formed the Auckland property management company, IconiCity, which in 2015 purchased the historic St Kevin's Arcade on Karangahape Road. Other high-profile property investments by to Reid and his companies include the Meridian Mall, Dunedin, Elliott Stables in Auckland, and Plasma House on Queenstown Hill, which was purchased from American billionaire Peter Thiel for $6.85 million in 2022.

An investigation by The New Zealand Herald newspaper in 2019 described Reid as New Zealand's "most prolific property flipper", flipping more than 130 properties in the six years to 2018 and earning over $4.5 million profit, including 70 apartments in 2013 alone. In 2020, during the COVID-19 pandemic, Reid's company, Icon Group, attracted criticism after serving notices to tenants of Elliott Stables to pay rent arrears or face eviction when their restaurants were struggling as a result of the pandemic.

In April 2022, Reid courted further controversy when he posted a negative review of a bar in St Kevin's Arcade, owned by his property company, criticising the bar's decision to continue using the My Vaccine Pass to screen patrons following the removal of the government requirement for hospitality venues to use the pass. The local Member of Parliament, Chlöe Swarbrick, commented: "I’ve seen a lot of things in my time, but it’s a first for commercial landlord negging his tenant who are doing their best to keep our community safe". Reid said that it was ironic that what was once an "anti-establishment and anti-government" punk rock venue was now "clinging so religiously to an outdated government mode of social exclusion", and he noted that he had written off over $2 million in rent owed by small business owners in the Auckland CBD.

In late 2024, Reid’s company purchased a block of approximately 30 neighbouring houses in Christchurch that had previously been acquired for a mall expansion project that was later abandoned. According to reporting by The Press, tenants received 90-day notices in the weeks before Christmas requiring them to leave by early March. Several long-term residents told the newspaper they were surprised by the timing and scale of the evictions, noting the difficulty of securing accommodation during the pre-Christmas period in a constrained rental market. One tenant of 23 years described the notice period as especially disruptive over the holiday season, while another family of seven, which included two children with special needs, reported significant stress caused by receiving the notice just before Christmas.

== Music ==
Reid continues to be involved in music, as vocalist and drummer of the rock trio Capital Theatre, releasing the single "People" in 2021.

Capital Theatre received two NZ On Air grants for new-music singles, with both grants paid to the production company Icon Music Limited, for which Reid is the sole director. Icon Music Limited is wholly owned by Reid’s parent company, The Icon Group (2014) Limited.

== See also ==
- List of Shortland Street characters
