= Primary (album) =

Studio album by Rubicon
- Released: 1 August 2002
- Recorded: 2000–2002, Auckland, New Zealand
- Genre: Pop punk
- Label: Wildside

Rubicon chronology
Primary (2002)	The Way It Was Meant To Be (2005)

Singles from Primary
- 1. "The Captain" Released: 2000; 2. "Funny Boy" Released: 2001; 3. "Bruce" Released: 2002; 4. "Happy Song" Released: 2002; 5. "Yeah Yeah (Rockstar)" Released: 2002; 6. "Energy Levels" Released: 2003; 7. "Rubicon City" Released: 2003

Primary is the 2002 debut from New Zealand pop punk band Rubicon. The album was released on 1 August 2002 and peaked at #16 in the New Zealand pop charts. Seven singles were released off the album, two of which charted: "Bruce" and "Funny Boy".

== Track listing ==
No.	Title	Length
1.	"Rubicon City"	2.30
2.	"Funnyboy"	1.79
3.	"Yeah Yeah (Rockstar)"	2.07
4.	"Happy Song"	3.14
5.	"All or Nothing"	4.08
6.	"Hey!"	1.59
7.	"Yr Own Good"	3.21
8.	"Energy Levels"	3.48
9.	"The Captain"	2.21
10.	"Bruce"	2.04
11.	"Been Around"	3.51
12.	"In My Mind"	3.46
13.	"U Dunno"	2.45
14.	"Blackkbird"	2.17
