= Bleeding Star =

Studio album by Jean-Paul Sartre Experience
- Released: 1993
- Recorded: June–July 1992
- Studio: Airforce Studio
- Genre: Indie rock
- Length: 39:12
- Label: Matador Records
- Producer: Jean-Paul Sartre Experience, Mark Tierney

Jean-Paul Sartre Experience chronology
The Size of Food (1989)	Bleeding Star (1993)

Professional ratings
Review scores
Source	Rating
AllMusic	3.5/5 stars

Bleeding Star is the final studio album by New Zealand band Jean-Paul Sartre Experience. It was released in 1993 via Matador Records and is credited to JPS Experience.

The album peaked at #6 on the New Zealand albums chart.

== Critical reception ==
Trouser Press called Bleeding Star "an immaculate big-budget production [that] ... unveils a new commercial face for the band." The Washington Post wrote that the album "is unfailingly pretty, but the lovestruck ethereality of songs like 'Breathe' is a little too wistful for its own good." Miami New Times praised "Into You," writing that it "kicks in with the powerful, hypnotic, ambient guitar sounds the band's known for, with great pop melodies skipping across the top."

== Track listing ==
1. "Intro" - 0:28
2. "Into You" - 3:49
3. "Ray of Shine" - 3:16
4. "I Believe in You" - 3:16
5. "Spaceman" - 2:46
6. "Still Can't Be Seen" - 2:56
7. "Bleeding Star" - 5:07
8. "Breathe" - 3:13
9. "Modus Vivendi" - 3:03
10. "Block" - 5:48
11. "Angel" - 5:30
