= Bad Optics =

- Lanterns episode
- Episode no.: Episode 6
- Directed by: Stephen Williams
- Written by: Justin-Britt Gibson; Damon Lindelof
- Cinematography by: Gregory Middleton
- Editing by: Emily E. Greene
- Original air date: September 20, 2026
- Running time: 53 minutes

Guest appearances
- Jason Ritter as Billy Macon; J. Alphonse Nicholson as the voice of John Stewart Sr.; Nathan Fillion as Guy Gardner; Shea Pritchard as Noah Macon; Jasmine Cephas Jones as the voice of Bernadette Stewart

Episode chronology
← Previous "Lights Out"	Next → "The Jordan Boys' Legacy"

"Bad Optics" is the sixth episode of the American superhero television series Lanterns, set in the DC Universe (DCU). The episode was written by co-executive producer Justin Britt-Gibson and series co-creator Damon Lindelof, and directed by Stephen Williams. It was first broadcast on HBO in the United States on September 20, 2026, and also was available on HBO Max on the same date.

The series follows experienced Lantern Hal Jordan and new recruit John Stewart as they investigate a murder in Rushville, Nebraska, which Jordan believes is an extraterrestrial incident and leads them to darker mysteries and reckonings. In the episode, John returns to Rushville in 2026, after Hal claims he wants to apologize.

According to Nielsen Media Research, the episode was seen by an estimated 0.55 million household viewers and gained a 0.14 ratings share among adults aged 18–49. The episode received generally positive reviews, who praised Nathan Fillion's guest appearance and themes, although some criticized the pacing and lack of momentum with the storylines.

== Plot ==
In 2026, after the events in Metropolis, (Note: As depicted in Superman.) John approaches the city council of Midway City to establish shelters for families in case of another attack, having established his own architectural firm with his brother Marcus. After winning over the council, he is called by Bernadette, who states Hal wants to meet up to apologize.

John meets Hal at the café in Rushville. Hal explains that after losing the ring, he was imprisoned for ten years, and grew depressed. He points out that John is also responsible for the events in Rushville and is afraid to own up to it, prompting him to punch Hal, breaking his nose. As John leaves, Hal warns him not to let the town know of his presence there. When John gets home, he is called by Kerry, who has him drive to the high school football stadium. They find Hal's frozen corpse in the bleachers, without his ring. (Note: As seen in "Pilot".) Kerry states that she and Billy had split three years prior and while in prison, Hal had been writing her letters. After getting out, Hal moved to Rushville to make amends with the town, but everyone hated him, though he endeared himself to her and they began a relationship, which they decided to keep secret from Noah. She gives him the keys to Hal's rented place, where he finds and feeds Earl. The following day, the coroner says Hal was killed by a handgun shot from close quarters, and agrees to delay the announcement of Hal's death, giving enough time for John and Kerry to investigate Hal's death and organize a private funeral.

Using a key belonging to Hal, John and Kerry enter a storage unit where they find a device that can be only opened with Hal's live voice. That night, John turns on a sky signal for the Green Lantern that has been installed outside the police station, angering some pedestrians, including Billy. When they threaten him, John fights them off, and he is arrested. After staying the night, he is awakened by the arrival of Guy Gardner. Guy cannot cooperate in his investigation, as it would be bad optics for the Corps. John then demands that he gets Hal's decommissioned ring for his funeral, asserting that he is only Green Lantern because John turned it down. Before leaving, Guy reveals that Sinestro was broken out of his prison.

John, Kerry, Guy, and Carol Ferris, Hal's former partner, are the only ones attending Hal's funeral. Guy arranges for Hal to be buried wearing his uniform and ring, and Carol asks John to read a eulogy written by Hal himself. After everyone leaves, John digs up Hal's casket, takes his ring, and uses it to summon the hologram of Hal's younger consciousness, who is surprised and disappointed to see he died.

== Production ==
=== Development ===
The episode was written by co-executive producer Justin Britt-Gibson and Lanterns co-creator Damon Lindelof and directed by Stephen Williams. It marked both Britt-Gibson's and Lindelof's second writing credits, and Williams' second directing credit for the series.

=== Writing ===
Showrunner Chris Mundy said that Hal Jordan's death was a struggle for the writers to accept, but they also felt that his death would be the only reason for John Stewart to return to Rushville. He said, "For us, it was a way to deepen Hal, even though he wasn't gonna go forward". Justin Britt-Gibson further added, "What I want audiences to take away from that scene is, look what this ring did to Hal Jordan. It made him so possessive, it made him so selfish".

=== Casting ===
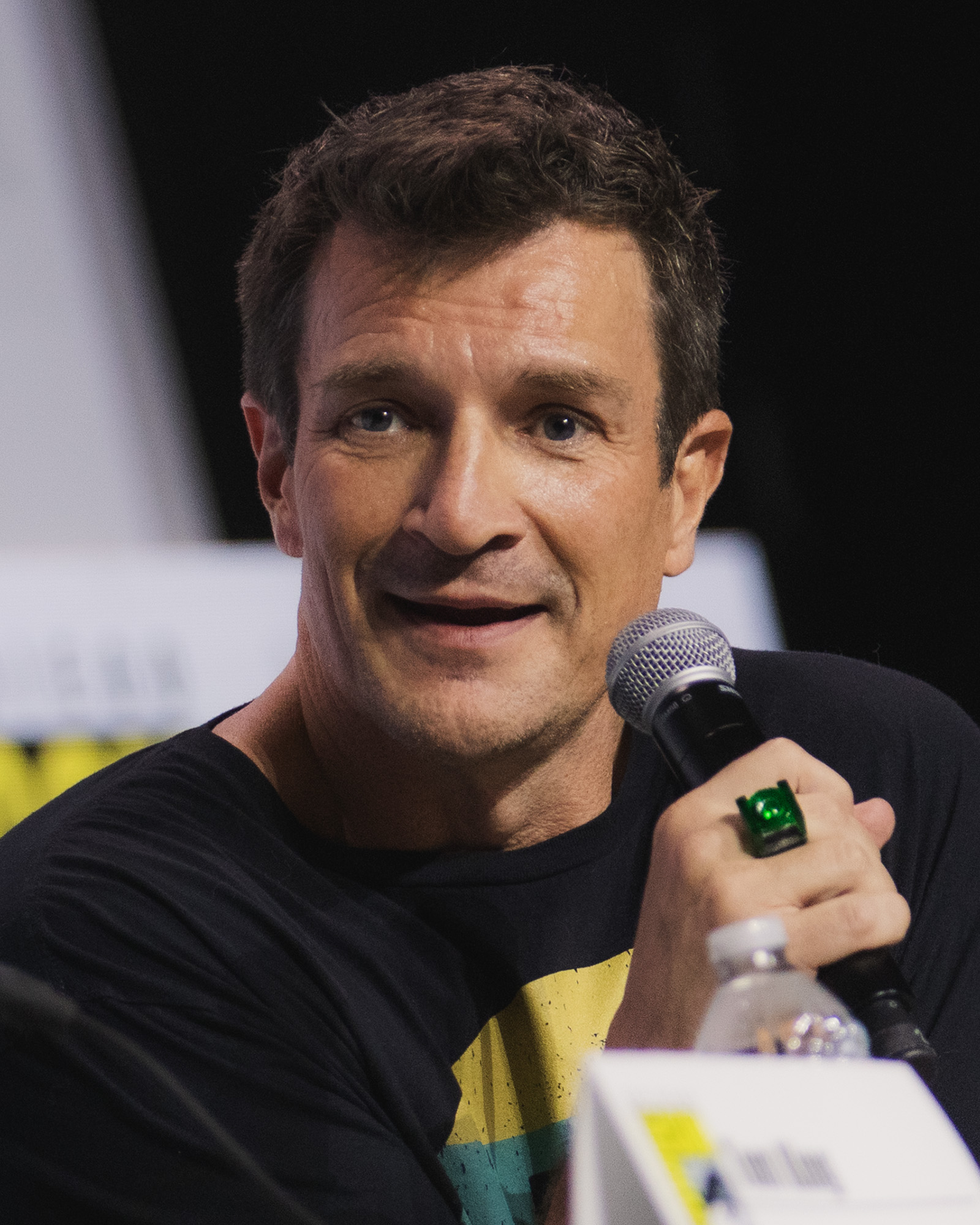
Nathan Fillion reprises his DC Universe (DCU) role as Guy Gardner in the episode.

Nathan Fillion guest stars in the episode as Guy Gardner, reprising his role from the DC Universe (DCU) film Superman (2025) and the HBO Max television series Peacemaker (2022-2025). Mundy said "We knew pretty much right away when we were doing the two time periods we wanted to have him in the show at least a little bit, just to explain to the world where we were in time. Hal was gone, and also to explain that we knew the time period".

Regarding his inclusion, Fillion said, "I didn't have any concerns. Conceptually, I got it. I just wondered how they would actually flesh that out. I likened it to this: If you're living in the DC universe and you spend a weekend in Metropolis and then spend the following weekend in Gotham, you'd be the same person — but you'd have two very different weekends". He said that Guy's priorities were wearing the ring and having the mantle of Green Lantern, "he doesn't like that he owes John Stewart anything — John Stewart needs a favor, and that's what he leans on".

Fillion also explained Guy's relationship with John and Hal, "Guy, John, and Hal are all part of the same secret club, and that fires Guy up. He's looking at them, and he's always thinking, "You think you're better than me? You're not better than me." Because, for all his abilities and advantages, Guy is limited. He's a flawed character because he's limited in his compassion. I think he comes around, eventually. He came around in Superman. But, man... it took a minute". He further added, "Certainly I think Guy Gardner's the kind of guy who says, 'Yeah, finally. I deserve this. What took you so long?' I think that's his mindset of he's very, very deserving of this honor. I think maybe even he thinks he's honoring them by joining this little organization of theirs".

== Reception ==
=== Viewers ===
In its original American broadcast, "Bad Optics" was seen by an estimated 0.55 million household viewers with a 0.14 in the 18–49 demographics. This means that 0.14 percent of all households with televisions watched the episode. This was a 19% increase in viewership from the previous episode, which was watched by an estimated 0.46 million household viewers with a 0.08 in the 18–49 demographics.

=== Critical reviews ===
"Bad Optics" received generally positive reviews from critics. Jesse Schedeen of IGN gave the episode an "okay" 6 out of 10 and wrote in his verdict, "Lanterns takes a fairly substantial hit in Episode 6, as the series struggles to move forward from the high water mark that was "Lights Out". The big problem facing the series right now is that Hal's death means we get a lot less of the core Training Day-esque dynamic, though hopefully that won't be a problem in Episode 7. The series is currently too invested in smaller storylines that feel unimportant in the grander scheme of things, when it really needs to dig into the mystery of Hal's murder and what the future holds for John".

Dennis Perkins of The A.V. Club wrote, "As ever, Lanterns stays human, as John's real shock and sadness at Hal's demise are real enough. John cares, but he's got a plan. Whether that's merely to solve his mentor's murder (and clear his name—see the stray observations) or something more bound to his confirmed leap to the big screen DCU in Man of Tomorrow, we're left, as is Lanterns' way, to ponder".

Siddhant Adlakha of Vulture gave the episode a 4 star rating out of 5 and wrote, "After its pilot tease, Lanterns finally moves into 2026, while staying tethered to some part of its Manhunter mystery. Its nature isn't quite clear yet — the show's sixth episode feels like a soft reboot or a brand-new season premiere — but it makes for a riveting coda to the Hal-John relationship, in an hour of television weighed down by grief in surprising ways". Ben Travers of IndieWire gave the episode a "B+" grade and wrote, "Whether the Hal-o-gram is meant to be a permanent addition to Lanterns remains to be seen, but his reintroduction certainly invites a question or two about how the continuing series could move forward. [Kyle] Chandler's portrayal of Hal is so charming, challenging, and flat-out fun that it's hard to imagine the show without him".

Joe George of Den of Geek gave the episode a 3.5 star rating out of 5 and wrote, ""Bad Optics" doesn't redeem everything with the previous episode. Hal and John's regret now doesn't make their actions feel less out-of-character in the past. Worse, the story doesn't do anything to address the anti-immigration theme the last episode apparently invoked. On a less pressing level, some of the choices in "Bad Optics" feel tired, especially the extortion subplot with Maggie". Daniel Chin of The Ringer wrote, "Lanterns enters a new timeline and a wider cinematic universe where superheroes and aliens are commonplace. This could have caused a jarring tonal shift, but the series smartly uses these fantastical connections to help mark the passage of time as Lanterns picks up the thread of its central murder mystery in a changed world".

Eric Francisco of Esquire wrote, "The DCU is so far away from introducing its own Batman who inhabits the same canon as Superman. But if Lanterns keeps up with being this good, we could stand to wait much longer. The Green Lanterns are way more interesting, anyway". Michael John Petty of Collider gave the episode a 7 out of 10 rating and wrote, "Will Lanterns stick the landing? That remains to be seen, but if it does, it will be despite the way it has propped up John Stewart at the expense of Hal Jordan, a creative decision that fans will likely have trouble forgiving long-term".

Noel Murray of The New York Times wrote, "I'm glad the adorably irascible Hal is still kicking around even after death, whether it be in backup form, or as a voice mail message ("Wanna come over and watch the 'skers?" he asks Kerry), or via his rambling eulogy, in which he hails the "man or woman" carrying on his legacy. ("Probably a man, not that there would never be a female Lantern, but I'm just playing the odds here.")" Denis Kimathi of TV Fanatic gave the episode a 4.5 star rating out of 5 and wrote, ""Bad Optics" is a somber episode of Lanterns which can feel jarring given the high energy of its predecessor. Still, it's an excellent one nonetheless".
