= Payola (New Zealand band) =

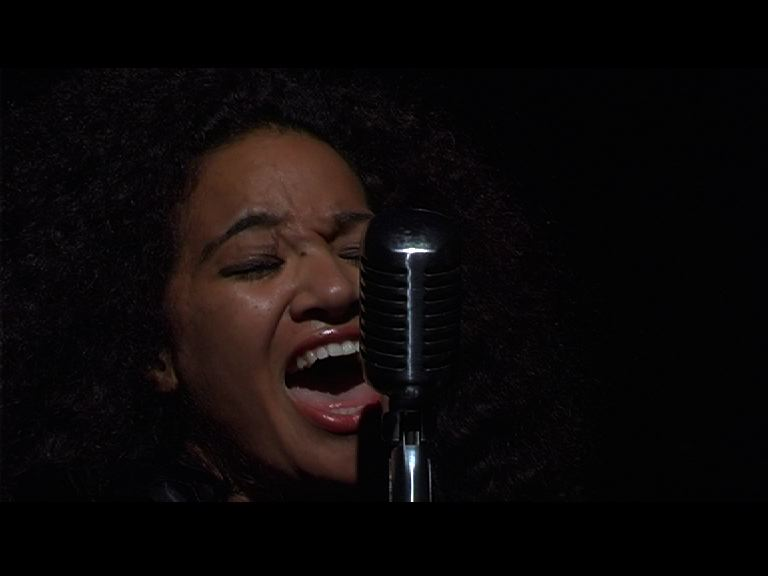
- Sophia Tupuola, Payola's lead singer

Background information
- Origin: Auckland, New Zealand
- Genres: folk, rock, soul
- Years active: 2005–present
- Labels: Independent
- Members: Lee Catlin; Solomon Cole; Sophia Tupuola; Simon McDowell
- Past members: Timothy William; Adrian Bergman; Nick Wood

Payola are a six-piece folk/rock/soul band from Auckland, New Zealand.

The group's first release was the album Gone To Ground in 2005. Lead vocalist Solomon Cole had exited his prior band, Auckland based Rootskonductor, to release a solo album through Wellington label Jayrem Records. The album was to be titled "PAYOLA".

Cole enlisted the help of drummer and childhood friend Adrian Bergman and jazz keyboardist Timothy William, a musician introduced through Rootskonductor manager Stephen O'hoy. UK bassist Lee Catlin (formerly of Orange Can) joined shortly after, having responded to an advert posted on the internet. He, in turn, introduced the band to Manchester percussionist Nick Wood to complement the recordings. Rehearsals took place in Mamaku, a remote suburb of Rotorua. The group of players proceeded to form a "band" as the focus of the solo record shifted. The original name of the record was adopted as the band moniker.

The band used the backing vocal services of NZ Idol finalist Indira Moala for initial recordings. However, due to a fees dispute, Moala subsequently and unsuccessfully threatened to sue the band. The dispute was settled amicably and the band recruited Sophia Tupuola to complete the recordings and finish the album.

== 2008 ==
Musical differences between the band and original drummer Adrian Bergman led to Bergman's exit in early 2008.

In April 2008 Payola won the Jim Beam sponsored Rock FM New Zealand-wide band search competition. The prize was the opening slot at the Vodofone Homegrown Festival held on 26 April 2008 at the waterfront in Wellington, New Zealand. Other bands playing at the event included Shihad, The Mint Chicks and Opshop.

== Band members ==
=== Current members ===
- Lee Catlin (Bass/Keys)
- Solomon Cole (Vocals/Guitar)
- Simon McDowell (Drums)
- Ben Teevale (Drums)

=== Former members ===
- Timothy William (Keys)
- Adrian Bergman (Drums)
- Nick Wood (Percussion)
- Sophia Tupuola (Vocals)

== Discography ==
=== Albums ===
Date of Release	Title	Label	Chart	Certification	Catalog Number
Albums
2005	Gone to Ground	Jayrem Records			cdjay395
2007	Dirt and Stars	Independent			

=== Singles ===
Year	Single	Album	Country	Charted	Certification
2005	"So Unless it's Over"	Gone To Ground	New Zealand	-	-
2005	"Every Little Step"	Gone to Ground	New Zealand	-	-
2007	"Oscillator"	Dirt and Stars	New Zealand	-	-
2008	"Scorsese"	Dirt and Stars	New Zealand	-	-
