= Jean-Paul Sartre Experience EP =

The Jean-Paul Sartre Experience

EP by Jean-Paul Sartre Experience
- Released: 1986
- Genre: Indie Rock
- Label: Flying Nun Records - FN057
- Producer: The Jean-Paul Sartre Experience, Rob Pinder

Jean-Paul Sartre Experience chronology
Love Songs (1986)	The Jean-Paul Sartre Experience (1986)	The Size of Food (1989)

The Jean-Paul Sartre Experience is an EP by New Zealand band Jean-Paul Sartre Experience released in 1986.

== Track listing ==
Quiet Side

1. Fish In The Sea - 03:27
2. Own Two Feet - 03:17
3. Walking Wild In Your Firetime - 03:10

Rock Music Side

1. Flex - 02:55
2. Loving Grapevine - 02:55

== Personnel ==
- Dave Yetton (guitar, vocals, bass, xylophone)
- David Mulcahy (guitar, bass, vocals)
- Gary Sullivan (drums)
- Jim Laing (guitar, vocals)
