= Jody Lloyd =

New Zealand musician

Jody Lloyd is a New Zealand electronica and hip-hop musician and record producer from Christchurch. He is the brother of Cloudboy vocalist Demarnia Lloyd, and the two siblings have frequently appeared on each other's recordings.

== Biography ==
In 1993 Lloyd formed the group Dark Tower, a two-piece featuring himself and Axel Foley (under the pseudonyms "The Earl" and "Axe" respectively). Dark Towering Inferno released their first EP, Real Zealmen in 1995, followed by the critically acclaimed Shadows on a Flat Land in 1998, the first release on Lloyd's own She'll Be Right label. Shadows on a Flat land featured collaborations with a swag of Christchurch musicians including his father, sister (Cloudboy's Demarnia Lloyd), Jeremy Taylor, Mark (DUFF) Duff and Claire Falloon. Mark Duff Shared production duties on the EP and engineered the production.

Eventually, more Dark Tower albums followed, with Canterbury Drafts in 2001 (nominated for best New Zealand hip hop album of the year 2001, NZ Music Awards), and The Dark World and The Pacific Scandal, both in 2005. Dark Tower produced an unexpectedly New Zealand voice in the local hip-hop scene, which had otherwise been dominated by an amalgam of American street styles and Polynesian influences known as Urban Pasifika. While Dark Tower's music had some Urban Pasifika influences, some critics claimed it revelled in kitsch kiwiana, defiantly presenting rap their own New Zealand accents and sampling such nostalgically New Zealand elements as old television theme music and folk music.

Lloyd has alternated Dark Tower's cut-up hip-hop in recent years with electronica and remix work under the pseudonym of Trillion under which name he has released six albums. These albums commenced with Fresh Jams in 2002, at a lucid end in 2003, this world and the sadvipra diversion in 2004, The gray between Shadow and Shade 2005, Audio Agriculture in the 21st Century in 2006, and 'SILENTinvisible', his masterpiece in 2008.

Lloyd formed the six-piece Trillion Band in the year 2004 and in 2007 the band was reduced to three members and took on the name The Incredible Braking Wheel, releasing a five-track EP.

Lloyd has also produced albums for Irish outfit Bazuki Joe, rapper Billy Wilson, Phil Johns, Le Mo Cafe, Catalyst Poetry Journals and Canadian writer and poet Jim Christy.

Lloyd is the founder of She'll Be Right Records, a Christchurch-based label specialising in natural accent New Zealand music including Mark (DUFF) Duff, John White (Mëstar), Andy Gibson, Ragamuffin Children, Simon Le Puffin, Phil Johns, Billy Wilson, Bazuki Joe, Jeremy Lips Taylor, Delaney Davidson, Tono, Jim Christy, Le Mot Cafe and Mark Tupuhi.
