= The Size of Food =

Studio album by Jean-Paul Sartre Experience
- Released: 1989
- Recorded: November 1988
- Studio: Writhe Recording, Wellington, New Zealand
- Genre: Indie rock
- Length: 33:58
- Label: Flying Nun Records - FN057
- Producer: Rob Pinder

Jean-Paul Sartre Experience chronology
Jean-Paul Sartre Experience EP (1986)	The Size of Food (1989)	Bleeding Star (1993)

Professional ratings
Review scores
Source	Rating
AllMusic	4/5 stars

The Size of Food is an album by New Zealand band Jean-Paul Sartre Experience, released in 1989. It was released via Flying Nun Records.

The album was rereleased by Fire Records as part of its I Like Rain: The Story of the Jean-Paul Sartre Experience box set.

== Critical reception ==
Trouser Press wrote that "while it has its share of Kiwi brilliance ... it also contains some distracting experiments that find the band flirting needlessly with art-rock and dance motifs". The Guardian called the band "often-overlooked", praising "Inside and Out" from the "excellent" The Size of Food. Blurt called "Elemental" the highlight, writing that "the whole album is very strong".

== Track listing ==
1. Inside & Out - 03:55
2. Elemental - 04:14
3. Slip - 03:11
4. Shadows - 04:01
5. Get My Point - 05:16
6. Gravel - 03:14
7. Thrills - 05:21
8. Window - 04:46

== Personnel ==
- Dave Yetton - guitar, vocals, bass, assorted sounds
- David Mulcahy - guitar, vocals
- Gary Sullivan - drums, assorted sounds
- Jim Laing - guitar, vocals
- Nick Roughan - engineer
- Rob Pinder - producer
