= Hooster =

- Origin: Christchurch, New Zealand
- Genres: Kiwi rock
- Years active: 1998–2005
- Labels: Failsafe Records
- Members: Ed Loughnan; Kris Giles; Kayne
- Past members: Al Evans
- Website: www.hooster.com

Hooster was a three piece rock band from Christchurch, New Zealand. The band released its first album, Rotate, in 2003.

The band won a recording grant in 2003, to record one song from NZ on Air. In 2004 they took part in the National Anthem charity telethon. In 2005, they went on to win a contest to be opening band at the Big Day Out Auckland music festival.

== Line-up ==
The band's original members were:

- Ed Loughnan – guitar and vocals
- Kris Giles – bass guitar and vocals
- Al Evans – drums

In 2004, Evans moved to a different city and was replaced by new drummer Kayne. Evans drums on all but one of the songs appearing on the recordings.
