= Dirt and Stars =

- Lanterns episode
- Episode no.: Episode 8
- Directed by: Alik Sakharov
- Written by: Chris Mundy; Damon Lindelof; Tom King
- Cinematography by: Armando Salas
- Editing by: Matthew V. Colonna
- Original air date: October 4, 2026
- Running time: 57 minutes

Guest appearances
- Nathan Fillion as Guy Gardner; Hannah Christine Shetler as Maggie; Matt Rhule as himself

Episode chronology
← Previous "The Jordan Boys' Legacy"	Next → —

"Dirt and Stars" is the eighth episode and first season finale of the American superhero television series Lanterns, set in the DC Universe (DCU). The episode was written by co-creators Chris Mundy, Damon Lindelof and Tom King, and directed by Alik Sakharov. It was first broadcast on HBO in the United States on October 4, 2026, and also was available on HBO Max on the same date.

The series follows experienced Lantern Hal Jordan and new recruit John Stewart as they investigate a murder in Rushville, Nebraska, which Jordan believes is an extraterrestrial incident and leads them to darker mysteries and reckonings. In the episode, John gets Sinestro to reveal vital information about Hal's killer, while also uncovering the truth behind his murder.

The episode received positive reviews from critics, who praised the performances, closure to the storylines and emotional tone.

== Plot ==
In 2016, as John goes to meet Lianna during the destruction of Rushville, (Note: As seen in "Lights Out".) Kerry checks on Hal at the motel. Hal blames himself for the events, stating the Guardians will now use this as an excuse to remove him.

In flashbacks from 2026, Hal is released from prison and reunites with Kerry. They go on a date to a restaurant, where Hal is frowned upon by the townspeople. After having sex, Hal agrees to visit an upcoming football game in town. That night, his house is burned down and he loses consciousness while trying to escape with Earl. He wakes up unscathed in Hammond's slaughterhouse, where Noah warns not to tell Kerry that he healed Hal, revealing himself to be a Manhunter.

In the present day in 2026, Sinestro tells John that Noah broke him out, but John is still confused by Noah's decision to save Hal. John tortures Sinestro to confess more details, with the latter revealing he forged a Lantern laced with the fear-inducing gas of Antaan's planet for Noah. When Hal's hologram appears, Sinestro reveals that Hal discovered Noah's wormhole. Sinestro attempts to sway the hologram with an offer to truly resurrect Hal, and warns that the hologram will be erased permanently if the ring is charged. John and the hologram leave with the Lantern and return to Rushville, abandoning Sinestro. Upon arriving John is subdued by Noah and forced to drive him to Rushville's football game, with Noah taking his ring. He claims that he did not cause the arson, but confesses to John that he killed Hal to prevent him from alerting Kerry. Noah reveals his conflict between his human upbringing and Manhunter nature to John, claiming to experience an involuntary thirst for power. Admitting he hates his nature, Noah asks John to mercy-kill him after he finishes the game.

At the game, John confronts Kerry about Noah's nature. She reveals that she saw Hal the night he died, when he confronted her over Noah. She reveals that Zoe's healing powers got her pregnant with Noah, and asks him not to tell Noah. Hal tells Kerry that Noah already knows his nature and proposes that all three of them run away together. As Hal presses her about the danger Noah both faces and poses, Kerry shoots him in a blind panic. John reveals Noah's request, but says he will not do it, as he believes Noah has shown the capacity to overcome his Manhunter programming. John leaves the game, while Kerry congratulates Noah for winning as the latter is approached by a Nebraska Cornhuskers coach.

John summons Guy Gardner, claiming he solved Hal's murder and that he "died a hero". He then reveals his ring and Sinestro's Lantern, and states he will serve as Earth's sole Green Lantern, while Guy takes care of the rest of the sector. Guy warns John that the Guardians will send the Green Lantern Corps after him, then leaves. Before the ring's energy runs out, Hal's hologram states that John will do a better job than him and tells him to accept his fear. Charging the ring, John utters his own oath (Note: The oath that John uses is: "In brightest day, in darkest night, I'll embrace my fear, I'll do what's right. I choose this ring, I choose this fight, in service to this lantern's light.") before using it to fly. The following day, Maggie receives her money and John leaves Rushville to return home, reuniting with his family.

== Production ==
=== Development ===
The episode was written by co-creators Chris Mundy, Damon Lindelof and Tom King, and directed by Alik Sakharov. It marked Mundy's third writing credit, Lindelof's fourth writing credit, King's third writing credit, and Sakharov's second directing credit for the series.

=== Writing ===
Showrunner Chris Mundy said that Noah's revelation was part of a new theme the writers wanted to explore, "What's programming, and what do you have control over? Noah becomes the perfect test case of that because he's a Manhunter, but he's also part human. John's going to gamble that programming isn't everything, but he's going to be there to keep people safe if he's wrong".

Regarding the final scene, Tom King explained, "What we see at the end is that John is not 100% a Green Lantern anymore. He has a Lantern that has a bit of yellow in it, has a bit of fear in it. It's an unsanctioned Lantern, as Guy says. He's not saying the same oath as every other Green Lantern because he's not like every other Green Lantern". Mundy said that the writers were not rewriting the Oath, referring to it as "remixing" it, "it felt, we wanted to be true to the original, and respectful of the original, like his version is rooted in the OG version of it. We also wanted to tweak it to talk about the themes that we talked about, and fear, and make it, make it be a choice that he was choosing this thing". Damon Lindelof further added, "For a man who pledged his loyalty to the military, to his parents, that's like this idea of saying ‘I'm kind of beyond doing that for other organizations, and in order for me to formulate an oath, it has to be on my own terms and in my own way.’"

Lindelof also stated, "most importantly, John was shaped by his own parents, by the will of the Guardians, by the culture, and he needed to go through a period of rejecting everybody else's premises and expectations and come to a place where he wanted the ring on his own terms". Mundy also confirmed that the ending was not based on any notes for the upcoming DC Universe (DCU) film Man of Tomorrow (2027), "We just wanted to put the period on the end of our sentence, basically".

== Reception ==
"Dirt and Stars" received positive reviews from critics. Jesse Schedeen of IGN gave the episode a "great" 8 out of 10 and wrote in his verdict, "Lanterns Season 1 comes to a mostly satisfying close in Episode 8. While the finale is light on actual surprises, the fact that we can see most of these developments coming a mile away doesn't mean they don't carry narrative weight. This episode packs an emotional punch and features some of the best performances of the season from Pierre, Chandler, and Macdonald. Whether or not Lanterns does ultimately receive a second season, the first has done its job in terms of establishing a compelling new hero in the DCU."

Dennis Perkins of The A.V. Club gave the episode an "A" grade and wrote, "A few episodes back, we heard Hal rush through his comics-accurate oath as if ashamed, or disillusioned. Its black-and-white, good vs. evil mission to root out and destroy spoke of the carceral state and the bureaucratic whim of (blue, alien) judges on high. It's enough to turn a good man bitter and cynical and... afraid. John Stewart will appear in next summer's Man of Tomorrow toting a hard-learned sense of the maddening but hopeful complexity of things, and I think the big blue boy scout and the green-suited Lantern will get along exceptionally well."

Siddhant Adlakha of Vulture gave the episode a 4 star rating out of 5 and wrote, "Lanterns has come to a close, and we can only hope the folks left at the Frankensteined Paramount-Warner Bros. — the newly-formed Skydance — greenlight a second season. The most justifiable criticism against the DC detective series is that its mysteries play out wordily, without letting the audience in on how its space cops come to major conclusions. This remains the case right up until the end of season one. However, it's a small price to pay for such wrenching emotional payoffs, in what might just be the best superhero TV series ever made." Ben Travers of IndieWire gave the episode a "B+" grade and wrote, "Sinestro isn't always right, the writers can do whatever they want, and the Hal-o-gram does tell John that he's “here when you need me.” Sure, maybe he just means that day, before John swears a new oath, but it feels bigger than that, and there's no definitive reason it couldn't be."

Joe George of Den of Geek gave the episode a 4 star rating out of 5 and wrote, "Was Lanterns the Green Lantern adaptation that everyone wanted? No, not exactly. It did not satisfy the desire for space opera and weird aliens. Was Lanterns a great story, full of compelling characters and thought-provoking ideas, executed at the highest level of craft? Absolutely. And for these eight episodes, that was more than enough." Sean T. Collins of Decider wrote, "even if you've never before contemplated the existence of a Yellow Lantern or the Sinestro Corps or anything more expansive than an army of our guys in green, there are those performances to pull you through. Even if Pierre is the only core cast member to return next season, again, he has the gravitas necessary to make the whole show orbit around him. If you overlook its problems, there's a lot to recommend about Lanterns. Next, I'd like a season where there aren't any problems to overlook."

Eric Francisco of Esquire wrote, "Lanterns season 2 might be a very different show entirely. It's impossible to imagine the show retaining its dark murder mystery atmosphere and gothic Americana vibes when there are Yellow Lanterns and Red Lanterns and Black Lanterns everywhere. But until we see anything from season 2, we still have a pretty damn perfect first season. I feel a rewatch coming on." Michael John Petty of Collider gave the episode a 7 out of 10 rating and wrote, "Lanterns' finale is a mixed bag that wrestles with both the notion of accountability and the tension between nature and nurture. The HBO drama may be over, but it appears that the actual Green Lantern adventures are yet to come."

Noel Murray of The New York Times wrote, "This finale does tie off the biggest loose ends and put a button on ideas that have been present throughout the series. Mostly it does so in a way that feels very writerly, where there is a clear and obvious meaning attached to everything the characters do. But the episode also ultimately connects emotionally, too." Bob Strauss of TheWrap wrote, "Now that we know (as if we didn't before) that Chandler, Pierre and Macdonald are superb at what they do, let's hope that Lanterns' creative brain trust — showrunner Chris Mundy and co-creators Damon Lindelof and Tom King — can give them future adventures that truly soar."
