= Rubicon (New Zealand band) =

New Zealand pop punk band

- Origin: Auckland, New Zealand
- Genres: Pop punk
- Years active: 1999–2005
- Labels: Wildside Records
- Past members: Paul Reid; Gene Bennett; Jon Corker; Scott Zant; Frank Zumo

Rubicon was a New Zealand pop punk band best known for their singles "Bruce" and "Funny Boy" from the early 2000s.

== History ==
Rubicon was formed in Auckland in 1999 by drummer, bassist and singer Paul Reid. He had previously drummed with Loves Ugly Children and The D4 and also played Marshall Heywood on New Zealand television soap Shortland Street. Reid was joined by his school friends: guitarist and vocalist Gene Bennett and bassist and drummer Jon Corker. The trio first gained attention with their song "California", which had come second in a demo competition held by Auckland radio station 96.1. This led to the band signing with Wildside Records, including distribution in New Zealand, Australia and Japan.

The band released single "Funny Boy" in 2001, which reached #46 in the New Zealand charts, followed by single "Bruce" in 2002, which charted at #22. The band's debut album Primary was released in 2002, charting at #16. Rubicon received 10 NZ On Air grants of $5000 for the production of music videos and a $50,000 grant for the recording of Primary.

In 2004 Bennet and Corker left the band to pursue their own musical directions, with Reid relocating to Los Angeles. New York musicians Scott Zant and Frank Zumo joined the band, with a new line-up of Zant on bass and vocals, Zumo on drums and Reid on guitar and vocals. In 2005 the band released their second album The Way It Was Meant To Be, but it did not experience the same popularity as Primary.

By 2006 Rubicon had broken up, with Reid having returned to New Zealand and launched a now defunct web directory similar to Craigslist called The Thing. As of 2012, Reid is the managing director of Auckland real estate company Iconicity, later renamed The Icon Group.

== Discography ==
=== Albums ===
Year	Title	Peak chart positions
Year	Title	NZ
2002	Primary: Released: 1 August 2002; Label: Wildside Records	16
2005	The Way It Was Meant To Be: Released: 1 October 2005; Label: Wildside Records	—

=== Singles ===
Year	Title	Peak chart positions	Album
Year	Title	NZ	Album
2000	"The Captain"	—	Primary
2001	"Funny Boy"	46	Primary
2002	"Bruce"	22	Primary
2002	"Happy Song"	—	Primary
2002	"Yeah Yeah (Rockstar)"	—	Primary
2003	"Energy Levels"	—	Primary
2003	"Rubicon City"	—	Primary
2005	"Mother Mother"	—	The Way It Was Meant To Be
2006	"Doin' Just Fine Without U"	—	The Way It Was Meant To Be
"—" denotes a recording that did not chart or was not released in that territory.
