= Kimo (band) =

Alternative music group from New Zealand

Kimo (formerly known as Eskimo) are a New Zealand-based alternative musical group consisting of David Mulcahy (ex JPS Experience, Superette and solo electronic project Mulchzoid) and Rob Mayes (Failsafe Records, dolphin).

They released the album loverbatim under the name Eskimo in 2004. In 2007 they changed their name from Eskimo to Kimo in to differentiate themselves from a number of other artists also using that former name.

The band performed a series of concerts through 2004 and 2005 with the inclusion of Drummer Michael Daly (YFC)

Kimo released their second album Surrender in October 2008 on Failsafe Records.
