= Skallander =

- Origin: New Zealand
- Genres: Indie folk, indie rock
- Labels: Involve, Loop Recordings, Type Records
- Members: Bevan Smith; Matthew Mitchell

Skallander is a New Zealand band made up of electronic musician Bevan Smith and jazz composer Matthew Mitchell. They have been making music under the moniker since 2000.

According to Smith, the name is "a play on the Russian word for ‘cosmonaut suit’. Which is skaffander? I think. Mitch's ex-partner is half-Russian, half-Hungarian."

== Musical style and recording process ==
Smith notes that due to Mitchel's jazz school background, Skallander's songs are recorded in an unconventional style. All the "song parts" (that is, guitars and vocals) are recorded in one take. They are then all timestamped 3–6 minutes apart (depending on song length). Mitchell improvises all the played parts on every song, including a substantial part of the lyrics.

Their second album (although released after the third album) was written wrote and recorded in under a week with one microphone, a sm57, used for everything, and then mixed in under a week. The audio was then run through a hi-end Neve compressor at Radio New Zealand National. Their third album took substantially longer, with the pair working on it for about 6–8 months. The mixes are very dense, with typically about 20–30 vocals layers per track.

== Critical reception ==
The Dominion Post reviewer Lindsay Davis gave their debut album 4.5/5 stars, saying "If you are looking to get beyond the barriers of downbeat albums then Skallander will take you there in style." Renee Jones wrote in NZ Musician that "Skallander's debut album 'The Camels' blends intelligent and innovative production with well-crafted songs."

In a review of 2007's Skallander, Matthew Stern said: "Almost surreptitiously innovative, [Skallander] finds the duo carving out a sound, using unique combinations to create something that doesn’t sound all too far off the beaten path, but resonates memorably."

Amanda Mills of NZ Musician said of their third album: "This beautiful album is sonic experimentation at its most intricate."

== Discography ==
Note: The third Skallander album was released prior to the second album due to delays at the label.

- The Camels (Loop Recordings: 2005)
- Skallander [3] (17 October 2007)
- Skallander [2] (22 July 2008)
