= Scripture in Song =

New Zealand recording and publishing brand

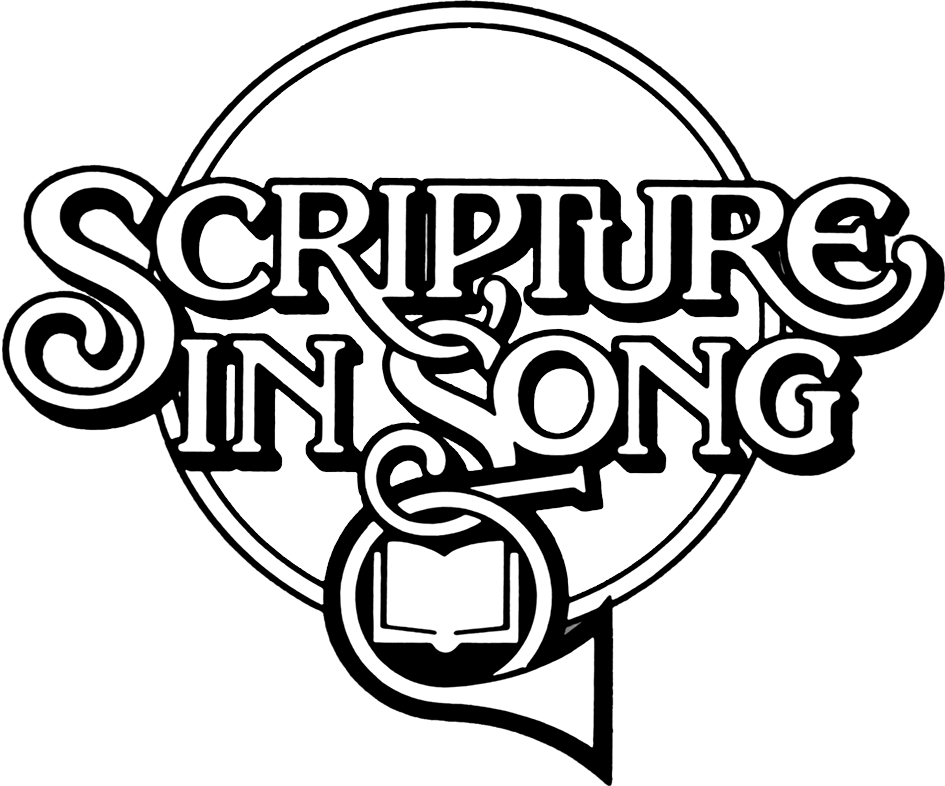
- Founded: 1968; 58 years ago
- Founder: Dale & David Garratt
- Distributor: New Sound Publishing Limited
- Genre: Contemporary worship music, contemporary Christian music
- Country of origin: New Zealand
- Location: Auckland
- Official website: scriptureinsong.org

Scripture in Song is a Christian music recording and publishing brand that was created in 1968 by married couple Dale and David Garratt in Auckland, New Zealand.

When they released their first album of the same name, neither could read or play music. Aiming to better incorporate Biblical scripture into contemporary worship music, the Garratt's went on to produce a series of albums and song books of Bible verses set to soft rock, and became leading musicians and songwriters internationally in the Charismatic movement in the 1970s and 80s.

Since 1968, Scripture in Song produced 41 records (with thirteen achieving gold or platinum status), sold over three million song books, and are credited for creating an "entire genre of contemporary Christian music".

== History ==
Dale Mary Adeline Garratt (Ngāpuhi, Te Aupōuri) was raised in Mount Eden, Auckland. David Reginald Garratt was raised in Dunedin as an Open Brethren. They met at a Youth For Christ NZ rally in Wellington in 1962.

After releasing their 1968 Scripture in Song EP album, a children's song book and album, and their first full-length LP record, in 1972, the Garratt's released their Scripture in Song double album Prepare Ye The Way. It became the label's biggest album, selling hundreds of thousands of albums globally, including 88,000 copies sold in New Zealand where it was certified platinum.

The Garratt's registered their recording company, Scripture in Song Recordings Limited, in 1973.

In 1974, the Garratt's held outdoor events at racetracks in Palmerston North and Tauranga. About 3,000 people attended each event. The Garratt's led worship at both events which were recorded live and released as the Scripture in Song album Praise the Name of Jesus (A Live Expression of Worship in the Outdoors). The album reached number one on the gospel charts in the United Kingdom. Christian songwriter Stephen Bell-Booth who played piano on the album said "David and Dale were revolutionary. They started a movement; it was a worldwide phenomenon, led by the Garratts from their base in Auckland. They were absolute pioneers."

When asked about being pioneers of a new style of worship music around the world, David gave credit to the Holy Spirit rather than his own ability: "It was interesting that the Holy Spirit did begin something that spread a long way. I’m not saying that it spread because of us at all, but it actually did begin something in New Zealand and God really did something with us as non-musicians that was somewhat unique because we just felt, right back at that stage, that He was wanting songs that are sung to Him and He was wanting us to encourage His people to worship and to learn His Word."

The Garratt's toured the US and Europe for 10 months in 1982. In 1984, they awarded the International Dove Award by the Nashville Gospel Music Association for lifetime achievement.

In 1993, Scripture in Song celebrated 25 years with the four-day Oct One event at the ASB Arena in Auckland, including guests Kevin Prosch, Steve Grace and Geoff Bullock.

The Garratt's went on to become leading figures in the global school of ethnodoxology, a discipline which helps indigenous cultures understand and express Christian doctrine in their own musical forms.

The Garratt's sold the Scripture in Song music catalogue to US publisher Integrity Music.

In 2000, one of their two children, Rachel, died of cancer at age 31.

In 2002, their company, Scripture in Song Recordings Limited, was removed by the New Zealand Companies Office.

In 2018 the Garratt's celebrated 50 years of the Scripture in Song brand. In 2019 they released I Exalt Thee, an album of re-recorded and produced songs from the previous 50 years.

Dale Garratt is acknowledged as one of the best-selling Māori composers. In 2023, NZ Herald Senior Writer Steve Braunias wrote, "There’s a case to be made that Dale Garratt is actually among the very best female singers in New Zealand music history." Dale has authored three books, The Pleasure of Your Company in 1984, The Profile of the Pioneer: Mentors to a Future Generation in 1993, and Please Help Yourself: Living, Loving, Learning & Preparing the Table in 2019.

In the 2024 New Zealand New Year Honours, both Dale and David Garratt were appointed Companions of the New Zealand Order of Merit, for services to Christian music production. In 2024, the New Zealand Herald wrote, "Their songs are used in virtually every Protestant church and they are recognised nationally and internationally as pioneering worship leaders and modellers of congregational singing, particularly for their contextual application of biblical texts and current musical trends."

In January 2024, Scripture in Song had 58,967 monthly listeners on Spotify.

== Discography ==
Albums produced by Scripture in Song include:

- Scripture in Song, EP (1968)
- The Bible Tells Me So, Single (1970)
- Thou Art Worthy (1970)
- Prepare Ye The Way (Parts 1&2) (1972)
- Love, Joy, Peace (1973)
- Praise the Name of Jesus (A Live Expression of Worship in the Outdoors) (1974)
- Selections from Scripture In Song and The Best of Scripture In Song (1975) - Compilation Album
- All Thy Works Shall Praise Thee (Volumes 1&2) (1977)
- Father Make Us One (1978)
- Strings of Praise (1979) [Instrumental]
- Songs of Praise (1980)
- Songs of the Kingdom (1981)
- Call To War (1981)
- A Patchwork of Praise (1982) [Instrumental]
- A Sound of Joy (1983)
- Songs of Praise 2 (1984)
- Songs of the Kingdom 2 (1984)
- Be Exalted O God (1985) [Instrumental feat. Fletch Wiley]
- Here's Some Of Our Best (1985) - Compilation Album
- First Love (1987)
- All Heaven Declares (1991)
- Combat (1991)
- Living Power ... Keep On Praying (1993)
- Songs Of The Nations: We Will Triumph (1993)
- Songs Of The Nations: Come With Praise (1993)
- Songs Of The Nations: Celebrate (1993)
- Scripture In Song – The Early Years 1968-1985 (1993) - Compilation Album
- New Sound (Vibrant Sounds of Multicultural Worship) (1995)
- Coming Home (2007)
- I Exalt Thee (2019)
- We Will Prevail (Ōtautahi), Single (2020)
- Songs of Blessing (2021)

== Bibliography ==
Song books produced by Scripture in Song include:

- The Bible Tells Me So (1970)
- Songs of Praise (1979)
- Songs of the Kingdom (1981)
- Songs of the Nations (1988)
- The Young Discoverers (1993)
