= Lights Out (Lanterns) =

- Lanterns episode
- Episode no.: Episode 5
- Directed by: Geeta Vasant Patel
- Written by: Justin Britt-Gibson
- Cinematography by: Armando Salas
- Editing by: Matthew V. Colonna; Vikash Patel
- Original air date: September 13, 2026
- Running time: 53 minutes

Guest appearances
- Laura Linney as Lianna; Jason Ritter as Billy Macon; J. Alphonse Nicholson as the voice of John Stewart Sr.; Paul Ben-Victor as Antaan; Jasmine Cephas Jones as the voice of Bernadette Stewart

Episode chronology
← Previous "The Weenie"	Next → "Bad Optics"

"Lights Out" is the fifth episode of the American superhero television series Lanterns, set in the DC Universe (DCU). The episode was written by co-executive producer Justin Britt-Gibson, and directed by Geeta Vasant Patel. It was first broadcast on HBO in the United States on September 13, 2026, and also was available on HBO Max on the same date.

The series follows experienced Lantern Hal Jordan and new recruit John Stewart as they investigate a murder in Rushville, Nebraska, which Jordan believes is an extraterrestrial incident and leads them to darker mysteries and reckonings. In the episode, Hal makes a strategy to catch Zoe Macon, revealed to be a Manhunter in human disguise, while John tries to use his own methods.

According to Nielsen Media Research, the episode was seen by an estimated 0.46 million household viewers and gained a 0.08 ratings share among adults aged 18–49. The episode received critical acclaim, who praised the performances, action sequences, and closure to Zoe's story arc.

== Plot ==
In 2007, a younger Kerry Kane is on the run from one of Gotham City's criminal organizations, who had her father killed for snitching on them. Her car breaks down just as she enters Rushville, and she stops at a diner. There, she is cornered by two hitmen who have been following her. Zoe saves her, easily killing one of the men and threatening the other man into lying to his bosses about eliminating their target. She has Kerry cut off her own pinky finger as proof of the deed. Zoe expresses sympathy over Kerry's situation, which she explains is similar to her own. She then demands that Kerry, as repayment for saving her life, joins the rest of the town's inhabitants in protecting her when the time comes. Kerry agrees and Zoe has her pinky finger grown back.

In 2016, an injured John is stuck in his crashed car. Hal states that he plans to pit Antaan and Macon's militia against each other in Rushville as a distraction, while he retrieves Zoe and takes her to Oa. He then abandons John, ending their partnership. Zoe arrives shortly after, but she lets the car explode first before taking a severely burned John to the hospital.

Hal summons the holographic projection of his younger consciousness, assigning him to locate Zoe. He then confronts Kerry, who stages a gunfight in fear of being watched on. She reveals she sent Hal and John to pursue the Hector Hammond decoy on Zoe's order and asks Hal to leave Rushville, not only because she owes Zoe but also because she fears she will target innocent people just to get to him, but Hal refuses. He leaves to meet with Antaan and his team in town, who have survived a shootout with the civilians protecting Zoe, and lies to them that Macon is the Manhunter; he sends them to the ranch.

At the hospital, Zoe confirms to John that she is the Manhunter, and John admits to distrusting the Guardians, having deduced that the Manhunters were their creations. She explains that her kind was created as a peacekeeping force but remotely exterminated after their methods were deemed too harsh, leaving her as the only survivor. She states that she intends to kill Hal and asks John to lie to the Guardians by claiming Hal died defending the town from Antaan, in exchange for healing him and offering mutual protection. After using her technology and her blood to heal him, Zoe admits she killed former Green Lantern Abin Sur, her programming not allowing the risk he posed for her safety, even though he spared her when he discovered she was the last surviving Manhunter and brought her to Earth to save her. As she leaves to lure Hal, John escapes from the hospital. He then takes a rifle from the gun store, telling his parents that he will forcefully take Hal's ring.

Antaan and his men attack Macon's compound using suicide bombings, enabling Antaan to reach the ranch. He confronts Macon, who claims to be the Manhunter. Antaan is not fooled, with he and the disguised Manhunter revealed to have been former lovers; Antaan kills Macon and cuts out his heart, confirming it to be a human one. Hal tries to catch Zoe's attention, but she begins to target the town with her armed satellites, forcing Hal to extensively use the ring to stop the attack and save as many civilians as he can. His hologram informs him that he located Zoe by the water tower and Hal rushes there. However, Zoe has Macon's men blow up the water tower, dispersing the black smoke that hinders the ring's power. Hal still manages to fight through as Antaan arrives, planning to kill Zoe with a suicide bomb. Hal manages to contain the blast by lifting Antaan into the air as he detonates himself, but Zoe escapes in the commotion.

Returning to the motel to charge the ring, Hal is ambushed by John. They engage in a brutal fight over the ring, until Zoe fires another orbital laser at the motel. Hal shields both him and John with the ring's power, but he is found alone under the debris by Zoe, who prepares to shoot him. He comments that he is being used as bait, and Zoe is shot in the head by John with his sniper rifle. He retrieves her crystallized heart. He subsequently takes Hal's ring and lantern and abandons him; Hal warns he will be replaced as well. John traverses the decimated town and is confronted by surviving civilians, but Kerry intervenes and has them put their guns down. He meets with Lianna at a bar, presenting her with the Manhunter's heart. Disillusioned with the Green Lanterns and the Guardians, John renounces the ring and leaves.

== Production ==
=== Development ===
The episode was written by co-executive producer Justin Britt-Gibson, and directed by Geeta Vasant Patel. It marked Britt-Gibson's first writing credit, and Patel's second directing credit in Lanterns.

=== Writing ===
Poorna Jagannathan commented on John Stewart's plan to kill Zoe, "John is the only person she has ever encountered that she didn't predict. Everyone else has always fallen into line. I think the last look is kind of game-recognized-game. It was a complete appreciation for someone whose sense of morality outdid anything and everything, and ultimately that's the only thing that could have killed her. Someone who broke the contract, and no one ever has". She also explained her smile before John shoots her, "is about the fact that she never thought she'd lose, and she never thought she would lose to someone who's in love with her".

She further explained Macon's last stand in the episode, "You go from thinking that I'm the trophy wife and he's the head honcho of the town, to that phone call we have in Episode 5 where it's clear what the actual relationship is. I have given him the gift of life, and he will do anything to protect and preserve me". Garret Dillahunt added, "He clearly knows their story and still wants to help. He clearly focused enough to learn her language, and he really thinks he can fool this intergalactic hunter that's come for his wife".

=== Filming ===
Director Geeta Vasant Patel felt it was essential to show the damage of Rushville after John takes the ring, which would make him question his position. She stated, "That is the moment where we were thinking, he is a broken man. This is all that's left of him. He's looking back – 'No, I'm not going back. I'm not becoming the person I've been. I'm going to be someone else.'" She cited the film Children of Men (2006) as an influence for how to approach the climactic action sequence on the streets of Rushville.

== Reception ==
=== Viewers ===
In its original American broadcast, "Lights Out" was seen by an estimated 0.46 million household viewers with a 0.08 in the 18–49 demographics. This means that 0.08 percent of all households with televisions watched the episode. This was a 17% increase in viewership from the previous episode, which was watched by an estimated 0.39 million household viewers with a 0.08 in the 18–49 demographics.

=== Critical reviews ===
"Lights Out" received highly positive reviews from critics. Jesse Schedeen of IGN gave the episode an "amazing" 9 out of 10 and wrote in his verdict, "The fifth episode of Lanterns is another winner. This chapter finally delivers the spectacle and action that have been in relatively short supply before now. But more than that, this episode thrives on the rapidly escalating tension that comes from having characters like Hal, John, Zoe, and Antaan all working in opposition to each other. It's a bleak and very tragic conflict, and ultimately, no one's hands are clean. "Lights Out" both satisfyingly wraps up the show's 2016 narrative and leaves us to wonder about what's coming in the final three chapters."

Dennis Perkins of The A.V. Club gave the episode a "B+" grade and wrote, "Empty. That's how Lanterns wanted its characters to feel — and us, too. It's a maddening mission statement for a genre exercise where gratification and punch-heavy superhuman problem-solving are the lifeblood, and I can't help but respect it — even as "Lights Out" leaves a certain unsatisfying aftertaste."

Siddhant Adlakha of Vulture gave the episode a 4 star rating out of 5 and wrote, "as it ends on a shot of the ring in the foreground, and John closing a door far behind it, Lanterns leaves off with open-ended plot questions, but with its significant emotional threads tied up in firm-but-thorny knots. That it feels like the end of a season only makes things more intriguing, because where on Earth or Oa could you possibly go from here? Well, only one way to find out." Ben Travers of IndieWire gave the episode an "A" grade and wrote, "Lanterns Episode 5, "Lights Out", is the HBO series' most thrilling hour yet."

Joe George of Den of Geek gave the episode a 2.5 star rating out of 5 and wrote, "Surely, that can't be the theme Lanterns intends. And the show still has three more episodes of story to tell, plenty of space to complicate what we see. But given the way "Lights Out" bobbles its central characters and its superhero conceit, one fears that the bright light that Lanterns cast in its first episodes is starting to dim." Daniel Chin of The Ringer wrote, "It's no easy feat to blend such spectacular elements with realism, and it feels like Lanterns may still be searching for the delicate balance between the two seemingly opposing strains of storytelling. But the series has still constructed a strong narrative by shrewdly pacing its grounded drama and character work and delaying much of its action for a well-earned payoff in Episode 5."

Eric Francisco of Esquire wrote, "when Lanterns came along, there came the question of how Guy would possess the one and only Power Ring that's been designated to Earth when Hal Jordan was training John Stewart. The fifth episode of Lanterns, "Lights Out", finally shows us how." Michael John Petty of Collider gave the episode a 7 out of 10 rating and wrote, "Lanterns takes what would have normally been the third act of a two-and-a-half-hour superhero movie and uses it as a nexus point that launches the narrative into the present day — and we still have plenty of questions."

Noel Murray of The New York Times wrote, "This week's Lanterns episode is a strange one. It is packed with action nearly from start to finish, as the aliens searching for the Manhunter descend on Rushville, killing locals. Meanwhile, Zoe — very much alive — mobilizes her husband's militia and her own artillery to fight back, causing even more destruction. The change from relative calm to outright carnage happens fast. Even though were told repeatedly in the early episodes that this is where the story might go, the mayhem still feels abrupt." Denis Kimathi of TV Fanatic gave the episode a 4.8 star rating out of 5 and wrote, ""Lights Out" delivers more than a study of what it means to wield a lot of power without understanding it. It also delivers on pure brainless entertainment as the manhunter fiasco comes to a head."
