= Demarnia Lloyd =

New Zealand musician

Demarnia Lloyd is a New Zealand musician, known for her work with the group Cloudboy. She has also produced comics. Lloyd was the inaugural artist in residence at Smith's Grainstore, Oamaru (2001). She has been in a number of bands a well as Cloudboy (Munky Kramp, Mink) and also works as a solo artist.

== Personal life ==
Lloyd is the sister of musician Jody Lloyd and the two have often appeared on each other's recordings.
