= Ethnodoxology =

Study of Christians in different cultures

According to the Global Ethnodoxology Network (GEN), ethnodoxology is "the interdisciplinary study of how Christians in every culture engage with God and the world through their own artistic expressions."

Other definitions developed and used during the first 20 years of the term being used:

- Ethnodoxology is the theological and anthropological study, and practical application, of how every cultural group might use its unique and diverse artistic expressions appropriately to worship the God of the Bible.
- Ethnodoxology is "the theological and practical study of how and why people of diverse cultures praise and glorify the true and living God as revealed in the Bible."
- Ethnodoxology is a theological and anthropological framework guiding all cultures to worship God using their unique artistic expressions.
- Ethnodoxology is the worldwide practice and study of arts facilitation that encourages the grassroots, local composition and production of artistry that is culturally relevant, biblically sound, and emotionally resonant, for use in the body of Christ for worship, discipleship, evangelism, and other extensions of God’s love in the world.

The term ethnodoxology was coined by Dave Hall. The earliest appearance of the term in print was a 1997 issue of the journal EM News (Vol. 6, No. 3), by the editor, Brian Schrag.

A broad resource for those in the field is a pair of volumes: Worship and Mission for the Global Church: An Ethnodoxology Handbook and its how-to companion Creating Local Arts Together: A Manual to Help Communities Reach their Kingdom Goals. The GEN YouTube channel contains many videos about the practice of ethnodoxology. The open-access scholarly journal Ethnodoxology: A Global Forum on Arts and Christian Faith contains peer-reviewed papers, working papers, and book reviews in the field.
