= House of Downtown =

New Zealand musical group

House of Downtown were a New Zealand-based electronic music act consisting of DJs / producers Christiaan Ercolano and Emerson Todd, active between 1999 and 2003, and again in 2021.

They released two well received albums on their own 'State House' record label via Universal Music, as well as several 12-inch singles on State House and Simon Flower's South Exit label.

== Albums ==
Their debut album 'Release' was held in high regard, and had the band viewed as "the act that could put New Zealand house music on the world map." It reached number 35 in the New Zealand album charts in July 2001, being supported by New Zealand radio station George FM. It had been delayed by Universal after uncleared samples were discovered. 'Release' had positive sales although had copyright issues; the band said their first album's release took so long that when it was released they were "... so over it".

The band released another album 'Mutha Funkin' Earth' in 2003, with the backing of Universal Music. According to Universal music's (New Zealand) then Managing Director, Adam Holt, they "...had no hesitation in funding their second album". 'Mutha Funkin’ Earth' reached number 32 in the NZ album charts. It was a diverse album, seeing appearances from hip-hop and R&B guests including 'Tha Feelstyle' and 'Tulele Faletolu'.

As an act, they combined DJing and live performance in the Auckland clubland in the early 2000s.

Christiaan Ercolano, originally from Wellington, was a local hip-hop scene pioneer. He was also the beatmaker in 'Noise N Effect', and worked with the Upper Hutt Posse. Those roots could be heard in House of Downtown's work, which merged house music with strong R&B influences.

Emerson Todd, an Australian raised New Zealander, met Ercolano while DJing.

After the second album the band split, and Todd moved to Sydney, then Berlin, where he continues to successfully release music.

Ercolano continues to DJ and produce, forming part of a DJ collective called 'audioclub', and half of electronic music duo 'DiCE', along with Dave Ti. They produce original and remixed material, including a remix of the House of Downtown track 'Feel It', and also a charity single with New Zealand soap opera Shortland Street to benefit the Starship Children's Health Hospital. with Lionel Wellington & JJ Fong.

In 2021, a new album called 'Re-release' is due, it features new remixes of the tracks on 'Release' by musicians including DJ Philippa, DiCE_NZ & Alkalino, as well as a remix by a new artist offered via a remix competition.
