= Shoes This High =

- Origin: Masterton/Wellington, New Zealand.
- Genres: Post-punk
- Occupations: Musician, singer-songwriter, record producer
- Instruments: Vocals; guitar; bass guitar; drums
- Years active: 1979–1981
- Past members: Kevin Hawkins; Brent Hayward; Jessica Walker; Chris Plummer; Andrew Strang; Don Campbell; Wayne Morris

Shoes This High were a New Zealand post-punk band formed in Wellington, New Zealand, in 1979. They disbanded in 1981 and three of the members went on to form the band Fishschool.

== Biography ==
=== History ===
The first lineup of Shoes This High included: guitarist Kevin Hawkins; bassist Jessica Walker; vocalist Andrew Strang and drummer Wayne Morris. They played their first gig in the Cuba Mall in Wellington on 18 November 1979. By the time of their next performance on 9 December, Brent Hayward had replaced Strang on vocals. Two weeks later, Morris left the band. Initially only a replacement drummer for a show at Thistle Hall, Don Campbell ended up being a full-time member, replacing Morris.

After befriending the band the Features they moved to Auckland in mid-1980 where they shared a house with members of the Gordons and Unknown Wrecks.

The first EP was released in a limited edition by the band itself through STH Records in 1981. Their sound was built around a mix of Captain Beefheart, Public Image Ltd, and The Fall.

=== Break Up ===
In 1981, the band split with Brent Hayward going on to perform solo as Smelly Feet and then in Kiwi Animal. Kevin Hawkins, Jessica Walker and Chris Plummer formed Fishschool who released tape recordings on New Plymouth's Ima Hitt Records.

In 2014, the posthumous live album Straight to Hell was released by Siltbreeze.

== Discography ==
=== EPs ===
- Shoes This High EP, STH Music, 1981

=== Live albums ===
- Straight to Hell, Siltbreeze, 2014

=== Compilation appearances ===
- "The Nose One" on Killed by Death DIY Volume 1, Redrum Records, 1999
