= Cloudboy =

New Zealand electronic music group

- Genre: Electronic
- Years active: 1995–2003
- Label: Flying Nun Records
- Past members: Demarnia Lloyd; Johannes Contag; Craig Monk
- Website: www.cloudboy.net.nz

Cloudboy was an electronic music group from Dunedin, New Zealand, that recorded and performed between 1995 and 2003. Their music is described as dark and introspective, mixed with occasionally upbeat songs. The band had three main members, Demarnia Lloyd as lead vocalist, Johannes Contag on keyboards, and Craig Monk with other instruments. Chris O'Connor was with the group on drums between 2001 and 2003. They then moved to Wellington for their debut studio album Down at the End of the Garden.

The band developed as a continuation of the group Mink. Lloyd in 2001 stated that "Mink was more poppy and loud and dance, whereas Cloudboy was a bit more introspective. Mink was a collective, Cloudboy is a band."

== Early recordings ==
Demarnia Lloyd began writing music for Cloudboy in 1994. This was released in a self-titled mini-album in 1995 and the single "Little Prince" in 1996, both through the Infinite Regress label. In 1996, they also released the singles "Pet" and "You Set Me on Fire" through Flying Nun Records.

== Down at the End of the Garden ==
They then spent the next five years working on their next album Down at the End of the Garden which was released in 2001. The album was well received by critics. Sales were significant and some of the songs received a high degree of radio play. Russell Baillie and Graham Reid from The New Zealand Herald rated it number 12 on their top 20 albums of the year. The album was released by Dunedin's Arclife Records.

The album was associated with a national tour from March to May 2001 and a later tour to Europe. The tour went to Germany, Czech, Scandinavia, and the United Kingdom. The group typically performed with other artists, sometimes with eight people on stage. Their performances were a mix of music and theatre, with elements of live and electronic music, film, and acting. This style of performance included the Shape of the Land a collaboration with the New Zealand Film Archive, which toured internationally, where they interacted with various films from the 1920s. In 2013 Cloudboy Unauthorised was released containing live recordings and demos.

== Discography ==
=== Studio albums ===
List of albums, with selected details
Title	Details	Peak chart positions
Title	Details	NZ Artist
Down at the End of the Garden	Released: April 2001; Format: CD, vinyl; Label: Arclife Records	3

=== Extended plays ===
List of EPs, with selected details
Title	Details
Cloudboy	Released: 12 March 1995; Format: CD; Label: Infinite Regress Music

=== Singles ===
Title	Year	Album
"Nicknames of Devils"	1995	Cloudboy
"Little Prince"	1995	Cloudboy
"Pet"	1996	Non-album single
