= Anita Prime =

New Zealand singer-songwriter

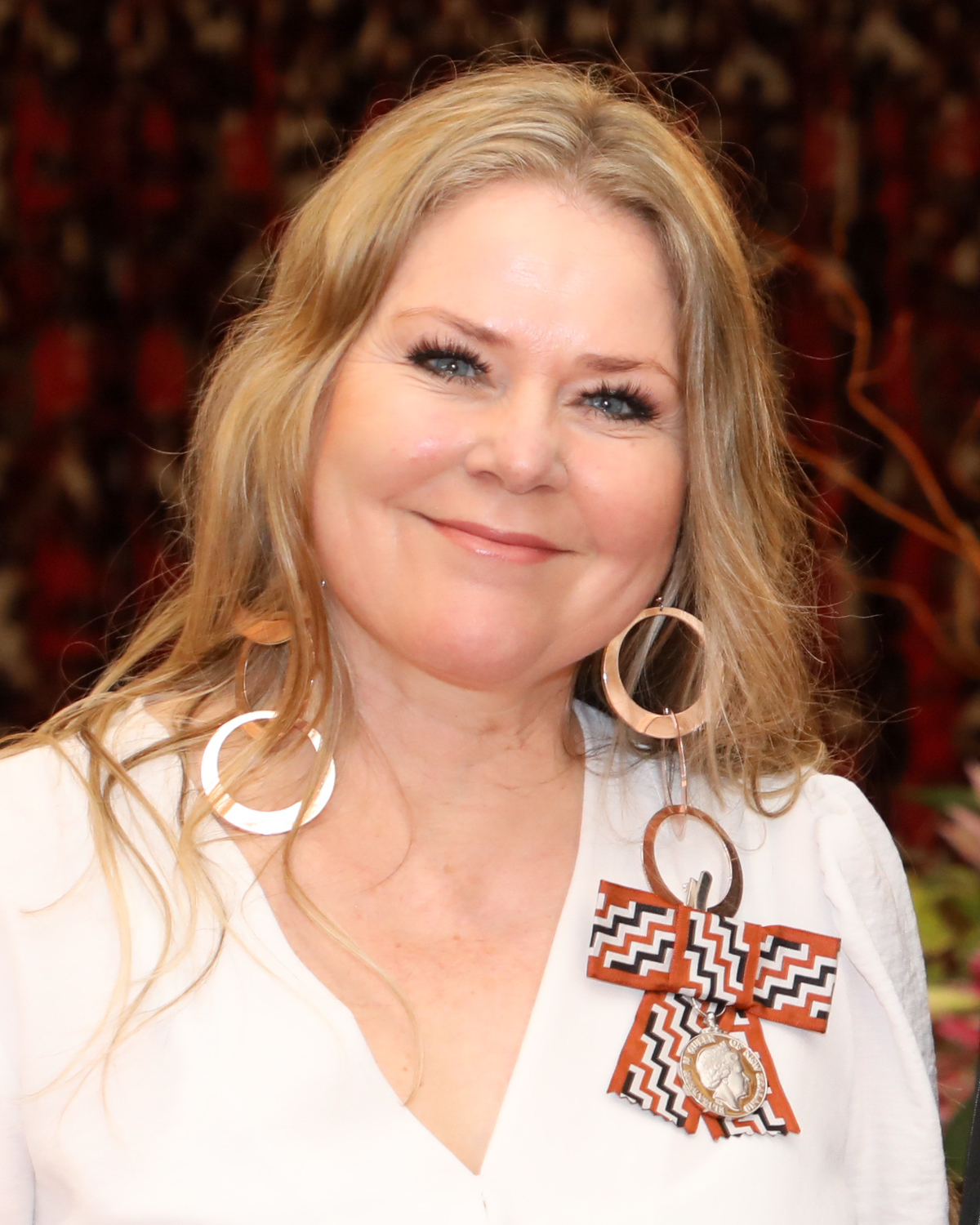
Anita Prime in 2022

Anita Ruth Prime QSM is a singer-songwriter from New Zealand. At the 2011 Los Angeles Music Awards she won the Best Music Video for La La La, becoming the first New Zealander to win a Los Angeles Music Award.

== Biography ==
Prime was raised in Palmerston North in a musical family with family members playing the piano, trumpet and ukulele. She began singing at a very early age, began learning piano from the age of 5 and went on to learn the flute, guitar and drums. Prime entered her first talent contest at 13 as part of a group called Three 'n One. As an adult she worked the New Zealand club circuit and performed in community and charity events.

In 2010, Prime met drummer Ron Thaler at a conference, who later re-recorded and re-worked her album Destiny. In 2011 Prime began an international tour performing in Paris, London, Vancouver and Los Angeles. While in France, Prime performed a solo concert at the Carlton Cannes Hotel on the French Riviera during the MIDEM Music Festival. The Destiny single "Complicated" entered Billboard's Dance Club chart in October 2011 and peaked at number 33 in November.

Between US tours Prime continued to work the club circuit in New Zealand and local festivals such as the Flava Waitangi Day Festival in Auckland, and the Māori Motown Festival in Napier.

In March of 2011, Prime was nominated for two LA Music Awards, Best International Artist, and Best Music Video for La La La. She performed at the Nomination Awards ceremony and again toured the US including other venues in Los Angeles and venues in New York. In November of the same year, Prime won the LA Music Awards Best Music Video category.

In May of 2011, Prime joined the 2011 All Star Rock Tour alongside Orleans, Robbie Dupree, Joe Lynn Turner (Rainbow, & Deep Purple), Joe Bouchard (Blue Öyster Cult).

Prime has worked with charitable group Team Xtreme, a charity that helps youth with esteem and life skills issues, and appeared in fundraising concerts.

At the 2021 Queen's Birthday Honours, Prime was awarded the Queen's Service Medal for her services to youth and the community.

== Discography ==
=== Singles ===
Year	Single	Album	Charted	Catalog No.
2011	La La La	Destiny	-	
2011	Destiny	Destiny	-	
2011	Complicated	Destiny	33	

=== Albums ===
Year	Album	Charted	Catalog No.
2010	Destiny	-	
