= The Knobz =

New Zealand pop band

- Origin: Dunedin, New Zealand
- Genres: Pop
- Years active: 1979–1981
- Past members: Tim Powles; Warwick Keay; Bob Reid; Kevin Fogarty; Mark Stubbs; Steve Haggie; Peter MacManus

The Knobz were a New Zealand pop band, originally based in Dunedin, but not considered part of that city's main wave of Dunedin sound bands. They became famous in 1980 with their political song "Culture?" criticising Rob Muldoon, who was Prime Minister at the time and had stated that New Zealand's pop music was not culture. Muldoon had made the remarks in the context of refusing to lift a 40% tax on sales of music. The Knobz were fairly typical of the New Zealand pop scene in the 1980s; they were described in an article of the time as "XTC meets The Knack". However, several things set them apart from their contemporaries. They were the first band to have a self-funded single hit the top 5 in New Zealand, released on Wellington independent label Bunk Records owned and run by Michael Alexander. They also managed themselves and toured extensively following chart success with two further singles – "Liverpool to America" (an opportune song about John Lennon) and "K.G.B." – and, later, an album, Sudden Exposure.

The band toured New Zealand before leaving for Australia in 1980, where they played with other acts of the period such as Divinyls, Men at Work, Mi-Sex, Swanee and Moving Pictures. The Knobz dispersed at the end of 1982, with some of the members moving on to other projects.

The Knobz later reformed with songwriter Kevin Fogarty for one more trip around New Zealand and to promote the album Roads to Rome. The new album had been written by former band members, but these were replaced with drummer Tim Powles and bassist Warwick Keay, both formerly of Flight X-7. Carey Peterson from Auckland walk and The Visitors also joined the band as vocalist to tour with the band in 1982.

== Discography ==
- "Radiation for Free" – self-released as Rockylox, 1979
- "I Like It" single – 1980, EMI
- "Culture" single – 1980, Bunk Records
- "Sudden Exposure" – 1980, WEA
- "Sudden Exposure" – single, 1981, WEA
- "Liverpool to America" – 1981, WEA
- "Roads to Rome" – 1982, WEA
