= Capital Theatre (band) =

New Zealand rock band

- Genres: Rock, Alternative
- Years active: 2020–present
- Labels: Reslau Records
- Members: Paul Reid, Adam Stevenson, Roy Oliver
- Website: http://capital-theatre.com

Capital Theatre (kAp-uh-tl thEE-uh-tuhr) is a rock band based in New Zealand made up of vocalist, pianist, and guitarist Adam Stevenson, vocalist and guitarist Roy Oliver, and vocalist and drummer Paul Reid.

== Career ==
=== Beginnings and formation ===
Stevenson, Oliver, and Reid met at a band jam night called Sing Sing at the Pony Club, a disguised, underground gentlemen's club. The owner, Brooke Howard-Smith, established the club in 2007 in Auckland, New Zealand, as a space for concerts he was hosting. The venue received criticism in the press including “a decrepit cesspool” and a “70s porn den”.

=== A Hero’s Journey ===
The band started recording their original songs in early 2020 with Guns N' Roses music producer, Mike Clink, out of NRG Studios in Los Angeles. Due to the COVID-19 shutdown, they were forced to relocate back to New Zealand where, after a six-week lockdown, they reconnected with Clink virtually, and worked remotely out of Neil Finn's Roundhead Studios using FaceTime and a live audio stream. The band finished the recording process and released the single, “Force To Fight”, on November 3 of the same year.

The debut album from Capital Theatre, A Hero’s Journey, was released on June 24, 2022.

Since then, they released four additional singles off the album, one of which (titled "Delicately Poised") they shot a music video for in Barcelona due to New Zealand being under lockdown restrictions. The video was shot at the underground adult entertainment club, Bagdad, while the band recorded their part back at home in New Zealand. The footage was merged to create the final video, which was co-directed by the band, along with Bruno Amaral Pereira and Julie Gomez of Kalapa Studios, and Alex Hargreaves (responsible for shooting the New Zealand footage).

Capital Theatre is signed to Reslau Records.

== Discography ==
Year	Album	Song title	Chart Position
2020	Kings and Queens of Our Own Empire - Single	Kings and Queens of Our Own Empire	
2020	Force To Fight - Single	Force To Fight	
2021	Long Way To Fall - Single	Long Way To Fall	
2021	People - Single	People	#43 US Alternative (Mediabase)
2021	FIRE - Single	FIRE	
2022	Delicately Poised - Single	Delicately Poised	#1 NZ Radioscope Rock Chart
2022	Delicately Poised - Single	Delicately Poised	#47 US Alternative (Mediabase)
2022	A Hero's Journey	Fait Accompli	#54 US Alternative (Mediabase), #39 US Active Rock (Mediabase)
2022	A Hero's Journey	Second Skin	
2022	A Hero's Journey	Time	
2022	A Hero's Journey	Better Than This	
2022	A Hero's Journey	Save a Stranger	
