= Beat Rhythm Fashion =

New Zealand post-punk band

Beat Rhythm Fashion is a post-punk proto-dreampop band formed in Wellington, New Zealand, in 1980 by brothers Nino Birch (vocals, guitar) and Dan Birch (vocals, bass), with Caroline Easther on drums replacing Glenn Stewart in 1981.

== History ==
They released three singles in 1981 and 1982, including their second single "Turn of the Century", which was "regarded worldwide as a classic". The band stopped performing in 1982, before Nino moved to Melbourne, Australia in 1984.

Bring Real Freedom, a collection of their singles and other recordings, was released in 2007 on the Failsafe Records Label and received strong reviews and response internationally.

Dan Birch died in 2011, but the interest in Bring Real Freedom and the international acclaim for their 1980s singles. The remaining members reconvened in 2017 to record Tenterhook, released in 2019, accompanied by a New Zealand tour.

The band continued to write and record new works, including 2024's Critical Mass, which received positive reviews that note its consistency with their original sound. "If you were a fan of the '80s BRF singles, especially, start with 'No Wonder' – the guitars here are as close to classic BRF as you can get – and the magnificent 'Fall & Rise Again'." "Critical Mass is a powerful and worthy addition to the Beat Rhythm Fashion catalogue". Graham Reid reported that the band was expanding its reach with powerpop and pop elements slipping into the band's sound.
