= John McGough (musician) =

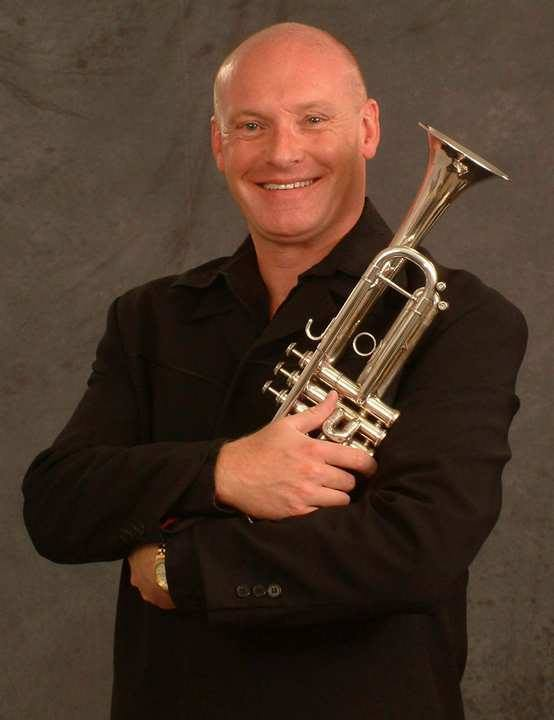
- Born: 1966 (age 59–60); Auckland, New Zealand
- Occupations: Musician, Singer, MC, DJ
- Website: www.trumpetguy.co.nz

John McGough (born 1966) is a musician and entertainer based in Auckland, New Zealand.

== Early life and education ==
McGough was introduced to the trumpet at the age of nine and studied under Vaughan McDonald, the New Zealand National Cornet Champion. When McDonald toured North America with the 1978 National Band of New Zealand, McGough continued lessons with Errol Mason, musical director of the Continental Airlines Auckland Brass and a noted cornet player.

== Career ==
In 1987, McGough performed as a soloist with the Continental Airlines Auckland Brass at the inaugural Rugby World Cup at Eden Park in Auckland, closing the international broadcast with "Now Is the Hour" to an estimated audience of 300 million viewers.

During his time with the World Champion Continental Airlines Auckland Brass, McGough served as their MC. he performed with Auckland-based groups including the soul band 7 Deadly Sins, Rick Bryant and the Jive Bombers, and the Queen City Big Band. In 1986, McGough and the Queen City Big Band were finalists for New Zealand’s “Rising Star of the Year,” alongside singer Annie Crummer.

At age 16, he was recruited as a support act for "Voice of New Zealand" Rhonda Bryers, then New Zealand Entertainer of the Year. He later appeared in Old Time Music Halls alongside performers such as Derek Metzger, Chic Littlewood, Doug Aston, Louise Malloy and Keith Leggett.

McGough has played with eleven New Zealand champion brass bands and two Australian champion bands, and has freelanced with ensembles including Waitakere Auckland Brass and Dalewool Auckland Brass. He has also worked with the Marlborough District Brass and NBS Nelson City Brass.

He was first selected for the National Band of New Zealand in 1990, appearing at the Commonwealth Games that year. He returned for the 1992 tour of New Zealand, hosted the band’s 2003 national tour, and competed as a player at the 2009 and 2017 World Music Championships in Kerkrade, the Netherlands. The band placed second in 2017.

In addition to performance, McGough has worked as an MC for musical and corporate events, voiced radio commercials, and hosted awards ceremonies. He has appeared on New Zealand television programmes including Stars on Sunday, Hui Pacific, Variety Street, NZ Today, 5:30 Live, Good Morning, Seven Sharp, The AM Show, and Rockin’ the Planet.

In 2020, McGough became a brand ambassador for CarolBrass instruments.

== Awards and recognition ==
McGough has received a number of industry awards from the Variety Artists Club of New Zealand including a Scroll of Honour for his contribution to New Zealand entertainment, the Agnew Award for Excellence and the Top Musician Award.

He has won two New Zealand solo titles on both cornet and flugelhorn. He also received a podium finish in the prestigious Champion of Champions event at the New Zealand National Championships when competing as a soloist in 1989.

- 2002–2004 : Best Compere, NZ Band Competitions
- 1989 : New Zealand Flugelhorn Champion
- 1983 : New Zealand Junior Cornet Champion

== Other activities ==
McGough has performed in many countries including a full New Zealand tour, Fiji, Vanuatu, Samoa, China, Vietnam, New York, Spain and has been guest soloist with bands in England, Australia and Saipan.

He has served as adjudicator at New Zealand, Auckland, Central District and Waikato/BOP brass band contests.

== Discography ==
- Two Shades of Brass (2017)
- Doin’ What I Do (2022) – includes the original composition "Ruze Vida" by Frank Beaumont

Both albums were was selected as in-flight entertainment on Air New Zealand flights.
