= Loves Ugly Children =

New Zealand indie rock band

- Also known as: LUC, The Uglies
- Origin: Christchurch, New Zealand
- Genre: Indie rock
- Years active: 1989–1998
- Labels: Flying Nun Records, Failsafe Records, Flat City Recordings
- Past members: Simon MacLaren; Angela 'Floss" Leslie; Jason Young; Paul Reid; Gregg Cairns; Scott McArthur; Simon Crockett

Loves Ugly Children were a New Zealand indie rock band on Flying Nun Records, amongst other labels, during the 1990s. They released two albums, many EPs, singles and videos and toured extensively through their home country of New Zealand, as well as Australia and England.

== History ==
Loves Ugly Children was formed in Christchurch in 1989 by vocalist/guitarist Simon Maclaren, Scott MacArthur (guitar), Angela 'Floss" Leslie (bass) and Simon Crockett (drums). The band recorded five tracks which appeared on a tape release called Stagger Failsafe Records.

The band split up and reformed as a three piece with MacLaren, Floss and a new drummer from Dunedin, Gregg Cairns. They didn't play any material from the previous line up, though they did decide to revert to the name Loves Ugly Children. They recorded several songs, none of which were released. Greg was offered an album and tour with The Verlaines, and left the band during July 1990. LUC again ceased to exist for nine months.

A jam with neighbour Jason Young (Excellent Soul Therapy and Cultivation) during May 1991 led to the reformation of Loves Ugly Children with their first gig only two weeks later. Important songs created in these first two weeks included Good Things, Strangers Song and Love You Dead which quickly became standards in the LUC set.. A tape-only release (Freak Scene) of the song Good Things went on to be #1 on RDU campus radio. The next six months saw LUC play many shows, win a war of the bands at The Carlton and tour the South Island.

In mid-1992 the band received an Arts Council grant and recorded the EP Purge. This CD-only release, recorded by Bart Barkman, came out on the Flat City label in August 1993 and would prove to be central to attracting the attention of Flying Nun Records. In between the recording and release of Purge, LUC worked on songs for the Avalanche CD Failsafe Records. One song from that session, Good Thing, which influenced the title of the Failsafe compilation Good Things on which it appeared.

The Uglies continued to have a strong live presence in Christchurch, including performing at the Avalanche CD release gig (April 1993) in front of an audience of one thousand. The band followed this with further local shows drawing large crowds to venues like Warners, helping grow the Christchurch scene along with other prominent bands Pumpkinhead and 147 Swordfish. LUC slowly built up their national following with successive North Island tours, eventually winning over Flying Nun's Roger Sheppard, and were signed to the seminal NZ label in early 1994.

The Cold Water Surf EP was recorded in winter 1994, with David Wernham on recording and production duties. Flying Nun released the self-funded EP in December 1994.. LUC started 1995 with their second appearance at the Big Day Out in Auckland, having played the first NZ BDO the year before. Other high-profile gigs included a support for Ministry at The Powerstation. The band was starting to gain a strong national momentum at this point, and began pre-production for their first Flying Nun album Cakehole. This was recorded at Fish Street Studios in Dunedin by Tex Houston during April of that year and released in September. During the latter part of 1995 LUC played in Australia on a Flying Nun bill with Garageland and King Loser, released an EP and video for the song Personal World, contributed to the Flying Nun ABBA tribute album Abbasalutely (they covered Honey, Honey) and ended the year with an extended tour in the UK.

During their time in London, Loves Ugly Children recorded the EP Suck and played many shows before financial constraints forced them home to Aotearoa. 1996 saw them play again at the Big Day Out and eventually relocate to Auckland in winter of that year. The Suck EP was released around this time, with an accompanying video, and the band started recording their second album, Showered in Gold with Matt Heine from Solid Gold Hell on production duties. More shows followed and they continued recording Showered in Gold after a master tape containing half the finished album was somehow lost.

1997 began with a slot at the Burning in the Light concert in Christchurch, and a great support for Rocket from the Crypt at The Powerstation. Showered in Gold was released in May that year along with the video for Six Pack, followed by yet another national tour. That proved to be the last tour for drummer Jason Young, who amicably left the band after a seven-year stint as LUC's drummer to pursue other musical projects, including playing bass in Future Stupid and later drumming again in The Unusuals before eventually heading to Melbourne to focus on live audio engineering.

For the last year of their existence, LUC worked with drummer Paul Reid. He featured in the last ever LUC video, Voodoo Girl and toured with them to Australia before Simon and Floss parted as a couple in September 1998, thus ending the career of Loves Ugly Children. Floss went on to open the Auckland band space The Killing Room. Paul Reid started the band Rubicon and became a regular on the NZ TV soap Shortland Street. Simon MacLaren went on to form The Subliminals and then his own melodic project, Sleepers Union.

As of mid-2012 there is work being done to create a Loves Ugly Children compilation album to be released on Flying Nun.

== Discography ==
=== Albums ===
Date of release	Title	Label	Catalog number
1995	Cakehole	Flying Nun Records	FNCD324
1997	Showered in Gold	Flying Nun Records	FNCD380

=== EPs ===
Date of release	Title	Label	Catalog number
1992	Purge EP	Flat City Recordings	FC003
1994	Cold Water Surf EP	Flying Nun Records	FNCD307
1995	Personal World EP	Flying Nun Records	FNCD336
1996	Suck EP	Flying Nun Records	FNCD366

=== Compilation appearances ===
The group have appeared on some compilations and soundtracks since their inception. The following is a list of albums that have featured tracks by Loves Ugly Children.

- (1993) – Avalanche (Failsafe Records)(SAFE024CD)- "Nothing More", "Citizens Advice", "Bleed"
- (1995) – Abbasalutely (Flying Nun Records) – "Honey, Honey"
- (1996) – Pop Eyed (Flying Nun Records) – "Suck"
- (1999) – Scarfies (Flying Nun Records) – "Suck"
- (2006) – Flying Nun 25th Anniversary (Flying Nun Records) – "Suck"
