= Superette (band) =

New Zealand rock band

- Origin: Auckland, New Zealand
- Genre: Indie rock
- Years active: 1993–1996
- Label: Flying Nun Records
- Past members: Dave Mulcahy; Ben Howe; Greta Anderson

Superette were a New Zealand indie rock band, who were signed by Flying Nun Records.

== History ==
The band was formed in 1993 in Auckland, New Zealand by members of the Jean-Paul Sartre Experience and Fang: Ben Howe, Dave Mulcahy, and Greta Anderson. The band's first release was the Rosepig EP, released in 1994. "Killer Clown" from the EP was released as a single in 1995. In 1996, the band's only album, Tiger was released, as well as a single taken from it, "Touch Me".

The band were often compared to Pixies, as well as Mulcahy's former band, the Jean-Paul Sartre Experience.

After the band split up, Howe went on to start the record label Arch Hill Recordings. Mulcahy released a solo album, Oddy Knocky, in 1999, and went on to record two albums with the band Kimo, and later fronted several other bands.

The band reunited in 2003 for a live show, and again in 2006 for a performance to celebrate the tenth anniversary of Tiger's release.

Tiger was reissued in expanded form in 2018, included songs recorded as demos for a proposed second album.

== Discography ==
=== Albums ===
- Tiger (1996 - Flying Nun Records - FN352)

=== EP ===
- Rosepig (1994 - Flying Nun Records - FNCD326)

=== Singles ===
- "Killer Clown" (1995 - 7" - Flying Nun Records – FN326)
- "Touch Me" (1996 - CD Maxi-Single - Festival Records – D 1280)
- "Touch Me" / "Anything" (1996 - 7" - Flying Nun Records – FN362)

=== Compilation appearances ===
The group have appeared on some compilations. The following is a list of these albums that have featured tracks by the Superette.

- 15 (1995 - Flying Nun Records - FNCD377)
- The Sound Is Out There (1995 - Flying Nun Records – FNCD334, Festival Records - D 1168)
- Abbasalutely (1995 - Flying Nun Records - FN315)
- Pop Eyed (1996 - Flying Nun Records - FNCD395)
- Topless Women Talk About Their Lives (1997 - Flying Nun Records - FNCD402)
- How Much For Trade? (1998 - Flying Nun Records - TRADEME1)
- Flying Nun 25th Anniversary Box Set (2006 - Flying Nun Records - FNCD500)
