= Jean-Paul Sartre Experience =

New Zealand indie rock band

- Also known as: JPS Experience
- Origin: New Zealand
- Genre: Indie rock
- Years active: 1984–1994
- Label: Flying Nun Records
- Past members: David Yetton; Dave Mulcahy; Gary Sullivan; James Laing; Russell Baillie; Matt Heine

The Jean-Paul Sartre Experience, later renamed JPS Experience after the estate of Jean-Paul Sartre threatened a lawsuit, were an indie rock band on New Zealand's Flying Nun Records.

== History ==
The band was formed in 1984 by Dave Yetton (vocals, bass guitar), Gary Sullivan (drums), and Dave Mulcahy (guitar). They were later joined by a second vocalist and guitarist, Jim Laing. Their first crudely recorded demo tape was supplied to university radio stations around the country in a can. It contained early versions of the songs "Einstein" and "Crap Rap" that would appear on subsequent releases. In 1986 they were asked to record a track for the "Weird Culture, Weird Custom" compilation produced by the student radio network. Their track was "Let That Good Thing Grow", which was re-released on their first album. They were subsequently signed by Flying Nun, who issued their eponymous début EP in January 1987, and début album Love Songs the same year, described by AllMusic as "an exceptional - if short - affair". After two further albums for the label, they added keyboard player Russell Baillie and abbreviated their name to the JPS experience after being threatened with legal action by Sartre's estate. After three EPs, Baillie departed in 1993, and the band released their fourth (and final) album, Bleeding Star, which took a noisier approach than their earlier recordings, drawing comparisons with Pixies and My Bloody Valentine. Mulcahy had left during the album's recording, forming Monster and later Superette and Eskimo, who released one album before shortening their name to Kimo. He was replaced by Matt Heine, formerly of Solid Gold Hell. The band continued until their split in 1994.

After the demise of JPS Experience, David Yetton recorded two albums with The Stereo Bus and one solo album, as well as playing with The Mutton Birds. James Laing released one solo album and Gary Sullivan performed on the first Stereo Bus album and on early Dimmer releases. Sullivan joined Solid Gold Hell. Jim Laing died on 12 April 2016 of natural causes. Before his death the band had been in talks to reunite and write new material. The band later played a one off-show, on 22 April 2016 at the newly refurbished Hollywood Theatre in Avondale to commemorate their friend and bandmate Jim Laing.

== Discography ==
=== Albums ===
Date of Release	Title	Label	Charted	Certification	Catalog Number
1986/1988	Love Songs	Flying Nun Records/Communion	-	-	FN078/COMM2
1990	The Size of Food	Flying Nun Records	49	-	FN122
1993	Bleeding Star	Flying Nun Records	6	-	FN246

=== EPs ===
Date of Release	Title	Label	Charted	Certification	Catalog Number
1986	Jean-Paul Sartre Experience	Flying Nun Records	-	-	FN057
1991	Elemental/Flex	Communion	-	-	COMM24CD
1993	Masked and Taped	Flying Nun Records	-	-	FNCD244
1993	Breathe	Flying Nun Records	9	-	FNCD245
1993	Into You	Flying Nun Records	47	-	FNCD271

=== Compilations ===
Date of Release	Title	Label	Charted	Certification	Catalog Number
1995	The Jean-Paul Sartre Experience	Flying Nun Records	-	-	FNCD078
2015	I Like Rain: The Story Of The Jean-Paul Sartre Experience	Fire Records	-	-	FIRECD357/FIRELP357

=== Singles ===
Year	Single	Album	NZ Singles Chart	Certification
1987	I Like Rain/Bo Diddley	Love Songs	-	-
1991	Precious	The Size of Food	26	-
1992	Breathe	Bleeding Star	9	-
1993	Ray of Shine/Shiver	Bleeding Star	14	-

=== Compilation appearances ===
The group have appeared on some compilations and soundtracks both in New Zealand and in Australia. The following is a list of these albums:

- (1999) - Scarfies (Flying Nun Records) - "Let There Be Love" & "Grey Parade"
- (1987) - Weird Culture, Weird Custom "Let That Good Thing Grow" National Student Radio
