= Dead Can Dance discography =

Band discography

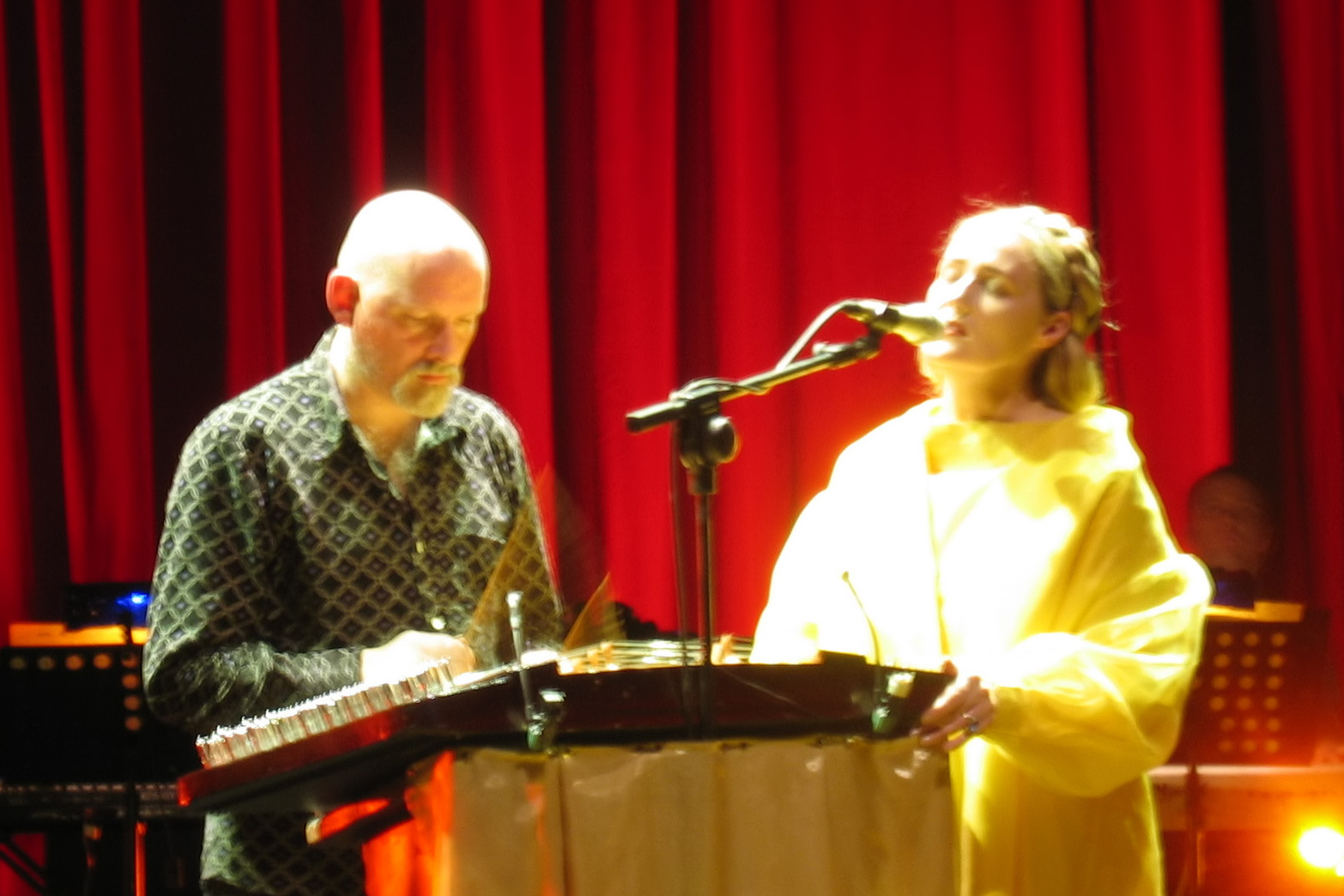
- Dead Can Dance in 2005; L–R: Brendan Perry, Lisa Gerrard
- Studio albums: 9
- Extended plays: 2
- Live albums: 2
- Compilation albums: 4
- Singles: 9
- Video albums: 1

Dead Can Dance is an ambient, world music band which has released nine studio albums so far, two live albums, four compilation albums, one video album, one extended play and nine singles. The band formed in Melbourne, Australia in 1981 but relocated to London, United Kingdom in 1982 and signed with 4AD Records where they disbanded in 1998.

Their catalogue was remastered by Mobile Fidelity Sound Lab and released in June 2008 by 4AD, initially on hybrid stereo SACDs, with a regular CD release of each album following in November 2008. This reissue series includes eight albums and the Garden of the Arcane Delights EP.

== Studio albums ==
Year	Title	Chart peak positions										Certifications (sales thresholds)
Year	Title	AUS	AUT	BEL (Fl)	BEL (Wa)	FRA	GER	NLD	UK	US	POL	Certifications (sales thresholds)
1984	Dead Can Dance: Released: 27 February 1984; Label: 4AD (CAD 404, CADC404); Formats: 12" LP, cassette; Producer: Dead Can Dance	187	—	—	—	—	—	—	—	—	—	
1985	Spleen and Ideal: Released: 25 November 1985; Label: 4AD (CAD 512, CADC512); Formats: 12" LP, cassette; Producer: Dead Can Dance, John A. Rivers	—	—	—	—	—	—	—	—	—	—	
1987	Within the Realm of a Dying Sun: Released: 27 July 1987 (CAD 705, CADC705, CAD 705 CD); Formats: 12" LP, cassette, CD; Label: 4AD; Producer: Lisa Gerrard, Brendan Perry, John A. Rivers	—	—	—	—	—	—	—	—	—	—	
1988	The Serpent's Egg: Released: 24 October 1988 (CAD 808, CADC808, CAD 808 CD); Formats: 12" LP, cassette, CD; Label: 4AD; Producer: Lisa Gerrard, Brendan Perry, John A. Rivers	—	—	—	—	—	—	—	—	—	—	
1990	Aion: Released: 11 June 1990 (CAD 0007, CADC0007, CAD 0007 CD); Formats: 12" LP, cassette, CD; Label: 4AD; Producer: Lisa Gerrard, Brendan Perry	—	—	—	—	—	—	64	—	—	—	
1993	Into the Labyrinth: Released: 13 September 1993; Label: 4AD (CAD 3013, CADC3013, CAD 3013 CD); Formats: 12" 2× LP, cassette, CD; Producer: Brendan Perry	178	—	—	—	—	—	70	47	122	—	
1996	Spiritchaser: Released: 3 June 1996; Label: 4AD (CAD 6008, CADC6008, CAD 6008 CD); Formats: 12" LP, cassette, CD; Producer: Brendan Perry	93	—	—	25	15	—	48	43	75	—	
2012	Anastasis: Released: 14 August 2012; Label: PIAS Recordings; Formats: 12" LP, CD; Producer: Brendan Perry, Lisa Gerrard	107	24	11	5	13	7	6	68	46	1	ZPAV: Gold
2018	Dionysus: Released: 2 November 2018; Label: PIAS Recordings; Formats: 12" LP, CD	212	55	44	25	—	8	40	59	—	7	
"—" denotes releases that did not chart or were not released in that country.

== Live albums ==
Year	Title	Chart peak positions						Certifications (sales thresholds)
Year	Title	AUS	BEL (Vl)	BEL (Wa)	FRA	NLD	US	Certifications (sales thresholds)
1994	Toward the Within: Released: 24 October 1994; Recorded: November 1993; Label: 4AD (CAD 4015, CADC6008, CAD 4015 CD); Formats: 12" LP, CD; Producer: Lisa Gerrard, Brendan Perry	185	—	—	—	76	131	
2012	Live Happening 1–5: Released: 26 June 2012; Recorded: 2005; Label: Self-released; Format: Digital download; Producer: Lisa Gerrard, Brendan Perry	—	—	—	—	—	—	
2013	In Concert: Released: 22 April 2013; Recorded: 2012; Label: PIAS Recordings; Formats: 12" LP (limited deluxe edition), CD, digital download; Producer: Lisa Gerrard, Brendan Perry	—	61	60	68	78	—	
"—" denotes releases that did not chart or were not released in that country.

== Compilation albums ==
Year	Title	Chart peak positions	Sales
Year	Title	FRA	Sales
1991	A Passage in Time (Note: A Passage in Time was a compilation album, initially released in 1991. It was issued in Australia in 1995.): Released: 21 October 1991; Label: Rykodisc (CADC1010, CAD 1010 CD); Formats: Cassette, CD; Producer: Lisa Gerrard, Brendan Perry	—	US: 60,000
2001	Dead Can Dance (1981–1998): Released: 19 November 2001; Label: 4AD, Rhino, Atlantic (R2 78359); Formats: 3× CD+DVD; Producer: Lisa Gerrard, Brendan Perry, John A. Rivers	—	
2003	Wake – The Best of Dead Can Dance: Released: 5 May 2003; Label: 4AD (DAD 2303 CD); Formats: 2× CD; Producer: Lisa Gerrard, Brendan Perry, John A. Rivers	160	
2005	Memento – The Very Best of Dead Can Dance: Released: 25 October 2005; Label: Rhino, Atlantic (R2 73264); Formats: CD; Producer: Lisa Gerrard, Brendan Perry	—	
"—" denotes releases that did not chart or were not released in that country.

== Video albums ==
Live performances

- Toward the Within (VHS, 1994; LD, 1994; DVD, 2004)

Contributions

- Lonely Is an Eyesore (4AD compilation, 1987)
- All Virgos Are Mad (4AD compilation, 1994)

== Extended plays ==
- Garden of the Arcane Delights (17 August 1984)
- Live Happenings – Part I (30 September 2011)
- Live Happenings – Part II (6 December 2011)
- Live Happenings – Part III (31 January 2012)
- Live Happenings – Part IV (20 March 2012)
- Live Happenings – Part V (15 May 2012)

== Singles ==
Year	Title	Peak chart positions	Album
Year	Title	US Alt	Album
1992	"The Carnival Is Over"^{[A]}	—	Into the Labyrinth
1993	"The Host of Seraphim"	—	The Serpent's Egg
1993	"The Ubiquitous Mr. Lovegrove"	8	Into the Labyrinth
1993	"Yulunga (Spirit Dance)"	—	Into the Labyrinth
1994	"American Dreaming"^{[B]}	79	Toward the Within
1994	"Sanvean"	—	Toward the Within
1996	"Nierika"	—	Spiritchaser
1996	"The Snake and the Moon"^{[A]}	—	Spiritchaser
1996	"Sambatiki"^{[A]}	—	Non-album single
"—" denotes a recording that did not chart or was not released in that territory.

== Music videos ==
- "Frontier" (1987)
- "The Protagonist" (1987)
- "The Host of Seraphim" (1991)
- "Yulunga" (1991)
- "The Carnival Is Over" (1992)
- "American Dreaming" (1994)
- "The Protagonist" (2003) [second version]
- "Kiko" (2012)
- "ACT II – The Mountain" (2018)
- "ACT II – The Invocation" (2019)

== In films and on TV ==
Dead Can Dance material has been used in films and on TV.

- "De Profundis" from Spleen and Ideal (1986) is used in:
  - The initial transformation scene of the Italian horror film Dèmoni 2 (1986).
  - Equinox 1997 episode, "Black Holes" (see black hole), with John Hurt narrating and appearances by Stephen Hawking and Homer Simpson, with portions of "Nierika" and "Song of the Stars" from Spiritchaser (1996).
- A cover version of "Enigma of the Absolute" – Dead Can Dance version is on Spleen and Ideal – is used in the Civilization IV game modification, Fall from Heaven 2, as the theme song of the Runes of Kilmorph religion.
- "Summoning of the Muse" from Within the Realm of a Dying Sun (1987) was used in:
  - A national women's gymnastics program.
  - The film trailer for Elizabeth (1998), starring Cate Blanchett, however, it was not in the actual film.
  - The ninth episode of the second season of How to Get Away with Murder.
- "Severance" from The Serpent's Egg (1988) was used in the Miami Vice episode "Victims of Circumstance" (season 5, episode 16) (1989).
- "The Host of Seraphim" from The Serpent's Egg was used in:
  - The film Baraka (1992) over scenes of poverty.
  - The 2002 film Ripley's Game starring John Malkovich.
  - Parts of Jeremy Clarkson's review of the Ford Fiesta on TV's Top Gear (2002) series 12, episode 6.
  - A film trailer for Terminator 3: Rise of the Machines (2003).
  - The trailer of the Iraq War drama Home of the Brave (2006) starring Curtis Jackson, Samuel L. Jackson, Jessica Biel, and Brian Presley – but not in the actual film.
  - Nick Broomfield's war drama, Battle for Haditha (2007) during the helicopter evacuation scene.
  - The final scenes of Frank Darabont's big-screen adaptation of Stephen King's The Mist (2007).
  - The Japanese CGI film Vexille 2077 Nihon Sakoku (2007).
  - The final scenes of Zack Snyder's big-screen adaptation of Kathryn Lasky's Legend of the Guardians: The Owls of Ga'Hoole (2010).
  - The third-season finale of How to Get Away with Murder (2017).
- "Yulunga (Spirit Dance)" later on Into the Labyrinth (1993) is played over scenes depicting concentration camps and torture chambers in Baraka.
- "How Fortunate the Man With None" from Into the Labyrinth is used in La Sirène Rouge, a French movie adapted from a book by Maurice G. Dantec.
- "Saldek" from Into the Labyrinth was used from 1993 in various commercials on Pakistani TV for the Don Carlos range of Servis, a shoe-making company.
- "The Carnival is Over" from Into the Labyrinth is heard during the finale of the 2009 film S. Darko, the sequel to the 2001 film Donnie Darko.
- "Sanvean" from Toward the Within (1994) features in The West Wing Season 5, Episode 1, "7A WF 83429" (2003), during the final scene when members of the Bartlet family are attending a private church service following the kidnapping of their youngest daughter, Zoey.
- "Rakim" from Toward the Within is heard during the opening scenes/magic act of the CSI: Crime Scene Investigation season 3 episode "Abra Cadaver".
- Spiritchaser (1996) track "Devorzhum", a soft lullaby, is superimposed over "Dedicacé' Outò" in the 2002 film Unfaithful.
- "Sacrifice" is used in "Bloodlines Part 1" of Silent Witness (UK TV series) as Dr Harry Cunningham is shot by an assassin in Budapest.
- "Elegy" has been used in several trailers for Man of Steel, and is part of the soundtrack.

== Cover versions ==
- Australian death metal band Abramelin covered "Cantara" on Abramelin (1996).
- Dutch rockers The Gathering released their cover of "In Power We Entrust the Love Advocated" on the Kevin's Telescope EP (1997).
- Czech folk/doom metal band Silent Stream of Godless Elegy released their version of "Summoning of the Muse" and "Cantara" on Behind the Shadows (1998) – they sometimes perform "Cantara" during live shows.
- The shoegazing band Ride recorded a version of "Severance" on Waves (2003).
- English goth rock group Bauhaus performed "Severance" during its 1998 reunion tour and included a studio version on Gotham (1999).
- Gothic metal band Paradise Lost covered "Xavier" in 2002 as a bonus track on limited edition of Symbol of Life.
- Norwegians Ulver covered "In the Kingdom of the Blind the One-Eyed Are Kings", Helena Iren Michaelsen's band Imperia covered "The Lotus Eaters", progressive doom rock band Noekk covered "How Fortunate the Man With None" and Hortus Animae's medley of "Windfall / Summoning of the Muse" in cooperation with Liv Kristine, appeared on the Dead Can Dance tribute album, The Lotus Eaters (2004).
- Sarah Brightman covered "Sanvean" on Symphony (2008).
- Celluloide covered "In Power We Entrust The Love Advocated" on Naphtaline (2008).
- Piano Magic performed "Advent" on their 2008 European tour.
- Canadian industrial band Post Death Soundtrack covered "Anywhere Out of the World", in 2009 – posting it on their official website.
- American death metal band Cattle Decapitation covered "In the Kingdom of the Blind the One-Eyed Are Kings" as a bonus track for their 2019 album Death Atlas.
- Polish punk rock band Armia covered "Advent" on their 1999 album Droga.

== Samples in other works ==
- The Chemical Brothers used a reversed voice sample from "Song of Sophia" in "Song to the Siren" (1992).
- The Future Sound of London used samples from "Dawn of the Iconoclast" as core elements of "Papua New Guinea" (1992).
- Intermix used samples from "Song of Sophia" on "Monument (Lost Classic Mix)" (1993).
- British progressive rock band Porcupine Tree used a voice sample from "As the Bell Rings the Maypole Spins" on the single Voyage 34 (1993).
- British pop duo No-Man used a voice sample from "Song of Sophia" in "Simple", from their album Flowermouth (1994).
- "The Wind that Shakes the Barley" was sampled by hip hop producer 4th Disciple on "Blood for Blood" by the group Killarmy, which appeared on Silent Weapons for Quiet Wars (1997).
- Delerium sampled extensively from "Persian Love Song" in the song "Forgotten Worlds" in their 1997 album Karma
- Orkidea used a lengthy sample from "The Host of Seraphim" in his 1999 single "Unity", which appeared on the Gatecrasher compilation album Red.
- Scooter used a sample of "Persephone (The Gathering of Flowers)" in the song "Habibi Halua" on their 2001 album We Bring the Noise!.
- British rock band The Mission sometimes use a looped sample from "The Host of Seraphim" as an introduction to "Tower of Strength" in rehearsals and at their live shows.

== Tribute albums ==
- The Carnival Within (2000)
- The Lotus Eaters (2004)
- Summoning of the Muse (2005)

== Contributions ==
- Fast Forward, Issue 008/009, Fast Forward Corporation, 1981 ("Fatal Impact")
- It'll End in Tears, This Mortal Coil, 1984 ("Waves Become Wings" and "Dreams Made Flesh")
- Dreams and Desires, Pleasantly Surprised, 1984 ("The Arcane (demo)")
- Lonely Is an Eyesore, 4AD compilation, 1987 ("Frontier" (demo) and "The Protagonist")
- Sahara Blue, Hector Zazou, 1992 ("Youth" and "Black Stream")
- All Virgos are Mad, 4AD, 1994 ("Rakim")
- 1980 Forward, 4AD, 2005 ("Emmeleia")

== Soundtracks ==
- El niño de la luna (aka Moon Child, 1989)
- Baraka (1992)
- In the Kingdom of the Blind (1992)
- The Crossing Guard (1995)
- Ruth's Journey (1996)
- In the Presence of Mine Enemies (1997)
- Nevada (1997)
- La Chacala (1998)
- The Affair of the Necklace (2001)
- Ripley's Game (2004)
- Killing the Afternoon (2005)
- The Mist (2007)
- Vexille (2007)
- S. Darko (2009)
- Legend of the Guardians: The Owls of Ga'Hoole (2010)

== Notes ==
A.CD promotional single.
B.Edited live version.
