= Wake (Dead Can Dance album) =

Compilation album by Dead Can Dance
- Released: 5 May 2003
- Recorded: 1981–1998
- Genre: Dark wave, neoclassical dark wave, world music
- Length: 132:49
- Label: 4AD Records
- Producer: Brendan Perry, Lisa Gerrard, John A. Rivers

Dead Can Dance chronology
Dead Can Dance (1981–1998) (2001)	Wake (2003)	Memento (2005)

Professional ratings
Review scores
Source	Rating
Allmusic	4.5/5 stars

Wake is a compilation album by Dead Can Dance, released in 2003. It contains 26 tracks over two discs. It includes the song "The Lotus Eaters" (previously released only on the Dead Can Dance (1981–1998) box set), recorded in 1998 as the last work by the band before their initial breakup.

== Track listing ==
=== Disc 1 ===
1. "Frontier" (Demo) – 3:00 – (1981) from the 4AD compilation Lonely Is an Eyesore (1987); completed version was included on Dead Can Dance (1984)
2. "Anywhere Out of the World" – 5:07 – from Within the Realm of a Dying Sun (1987)
3. "Enigma of the Absolute" – 4:14 – from Spleen and Ideal (1985)
4. "Carnival of Light" – 3:30 – from Garden of the Arcane Delights (1984)
5. "In Power We Entrust the Love Advocated" – 4:10 – from Garden of the Arcane Delights (1984)
6. "Summoning of the Muse" – 4:57 – from Within the Realm of a Dying Sun (1987)
7. "Windfall" – 3:31 – from Within the Realm of a Dying Sun (1987)
8. "In the Kingdom of the Blind the One-Eyed Are Kings" – 4:10 – from The Serpent's Egg (1988)
9. "The Host of Seraphim" – 6:17 – from The Serpent's Egg (1988)
10. "Bird" – 5:00 – from A Passage in Time (1991)
11. "Cantara" – 5:58 – from Within the Realm of a Dying Sun (1987)
12. "Severance" – 3:21 – from The Serpent's Egg (1988)
13. "Saltarello" – 2:36 – from Aion (1990)
14. "Black Sun" – 4:56 – from Aion (1990)

=== Disc 2 ===
1. "Yulunga (Spirit Dance)" – 6:57 – from Into the Labyrinth (1993)
2. "The Carnival Is Over" – 5:42 – from Into the Labyrinth (1993)
3. "The Lotus Eaters" – 6:42 – (1998) from Dead Can Dance (1981–1998) (2001)
4. "Rakim" – 5:38 – from Toward the Within (1994)
5. "The Ubiquitous Mr Lovegrove" – 6:14 – from Into the Labyrinth (1993)
6. "Sanvean" – 3:46 – from Toward the Within (1994)
7. "Song of the Nile" – 8:00 – from Spiritchaser (1996)
8. "The Spider's Stratagem" – 6:41 – from Into the Labyrinth (1993)
9. "I Can See Now" – 2:56 – from Toward the Within (1994)
10. "American Dreaming" – 4:30 – from Toward the Within (1994)
11. "Nierika" – 5:45 – from Spiritchaser (1996)
12. "How Fortunate the Man with None" – 9:09 – from Into the Labyrinth (1993)
- The tracks from Toward the Within are live tracks, but with crowd noise removed to make them sound like studio versions. They previously appeared in this form on the Dead Can Dance (1981–1998) box set.
