= Memento (Dead Can Dance album) =

Compilation album by Dead Can Dance
- Released: 25 October 2005
- Recorded: 1981–1998
- Genre: Dark wave, neoclassical dark wave, world music
- Length: 78:01
- Label: Rhino/Atlantic Records; 73264
- Producer: Brendan Perry, Lisa Gerrard, John A. Rivers

Dead Can Dance chronology
Wake (2003)	Memento (2005)	Anastasis (2012)

Memento, subtitled The Very Best of Dead Can Dance, is a compilation album by Dead Can Dance, released 25 October 2005, shortly after their US tour. Designed for the American market, this compilation focused on the second half of the band's musical career, when the duo were at their most successful in that country.

The album was rated a 7.6 out of 10 by Pitchfork.

== Track listing ==
1. "Nierika" – 5:47 – from Spiritchaser (1996)
2. "The Ubiquitous Mr Lovegrove" – 6:16 – from Into the Labyrinth (1993)
3. "Cantara" – 5:59 – from Within the Realm of a Dying Sun (1987)
4. "The Carnival is Over" – 5:26 – from Into the Labyrinth (1993)
5. "Ariadne" – 1:55 – from Into the Labyrinth (1993)
6. "Enigma of the Absolute" – 4:14 – from Spleen and Ideal (1985)
7. "The Lotus Eaters" – 6:42 – from Dead Can Dance (1981–1998) (2001)
8. "In the Kingdom of the Blind the One-Eyed Are Kings" – 4:12 – from The Serpent's Egg (1988)
9. "Sanvean" – 3:48 – from Toward the Within (1994)
10. "Yulunga" – 6:57 – from Into the Labyrinth (1993)
11. "The Song of the Sibyl" – 3:47 – from Aion (1990)
12. "I Can See Now" – 2:56 – from Toward the Within (1994)
13. "American Dreaming" – 4:31 – from Toward the Within (1994)
14. "The Host of Seraphim" – 6:20 – from The Serpent's Egg (1988)
15. "How Fortunate the Man With None" – 9:11 – from Into the Labyrinth (1993)
