= A Passage in Time (Dead Can Dance album) =

Compilation album by Dead Can Dance
- Released: 21 October 1991
- Recorded: 1985, 1987, 1988, 1990, 1991
- Genre: Neoclassical dark wave, world fusion
- Length: 64:17
- Label: Rykodisc; RCD 20215
- Producer: Brendan Perry; Lisa Gerrard

Dead Can Dance chronology
Aion (1990)	A Passage in Time (1991)	Into the Labyrinth (1993)

Professional ratings
Review scores
Source	Rating
AllMusic	4.5/5 stars

A Passage in Time is a compilation album by Australian musical act Dead Can Dance. It was originally released in North America on 21 October 1991 by Rykodisc, in the United Kingdom on 4 November 1991 by 4AD, and was later remastered and given an Australian release in 1995.

The album was titled after the song "A Passage in Time", which originally appeared on the group's eponymous debut album in 1984 but was not included in the collection.

By 1993, the album had sold 60,000 copies in the United States according to Soundscan.

== Overview ==
As the title suggests, this album was "a passage in time" to enable the U.S. audience catch up with the band's previous albums, via selected songs.

The content of the compilation was predominantly taken from the band's most recent works at the time, their fourth (The Serpent's Egg) and fifth (Aion) albums. It also featured two songs from their third album (Within the Realm of a Dying Sun) and one from their second (Spleen and Ideal), but no selections from their debut or the Garden of the Arcane Delights EP. Two previously unreleased tracks were included, "Bird" and "Spirit" (both were later added to the double vinyl version of 1993's Into the Labyrinth).

== Track listing ==
	Title		Album	Year
1	"Saltarello"	2:36	Aion	1990
2	"Song of Sophia"	1:23	The Serpent's Egg	1988
3	"Ullyses" [sic]	4:53	The Serpent's Egg	1988
4	"Cantara"	5:52	Within the Realm of a Dying Sun	1987
5	"The Garden of Zephirus"	1:19	Aion	1990
6	"Enigma of the Absolute"	4:12	Spleen and Ideal	1985
7	"Wilderness"	1:23	Aion	1990
8	"The Host of Seraphim"	6:17	The Serpent's Egg	1988
9	"Anywhere Out of the World"	5:05	Within the Realm of a Dying Sun	1987
10	"The Writing on My Father's Hand"	3:50	The Serpent's Egg	1988
11	"Severance"	3:21	The Serpent's Egg	1988
12	"The Song of the Sybil" [sic]	3:45	Aion	1990
13	"Fortune Presents Gifts Not According to the Book"	6:03	Aion	1990
14	"In the Kingdom of the Blind The One-Eyed are Kings"	4:09	The Serpent's Egg	1988
15	"Bird"	5:00	(new track)	1991
16	"Spirit"	4:59	(new track)	1991
