= Peter Ulrich =

British songwriter and recording artist (born 1958)

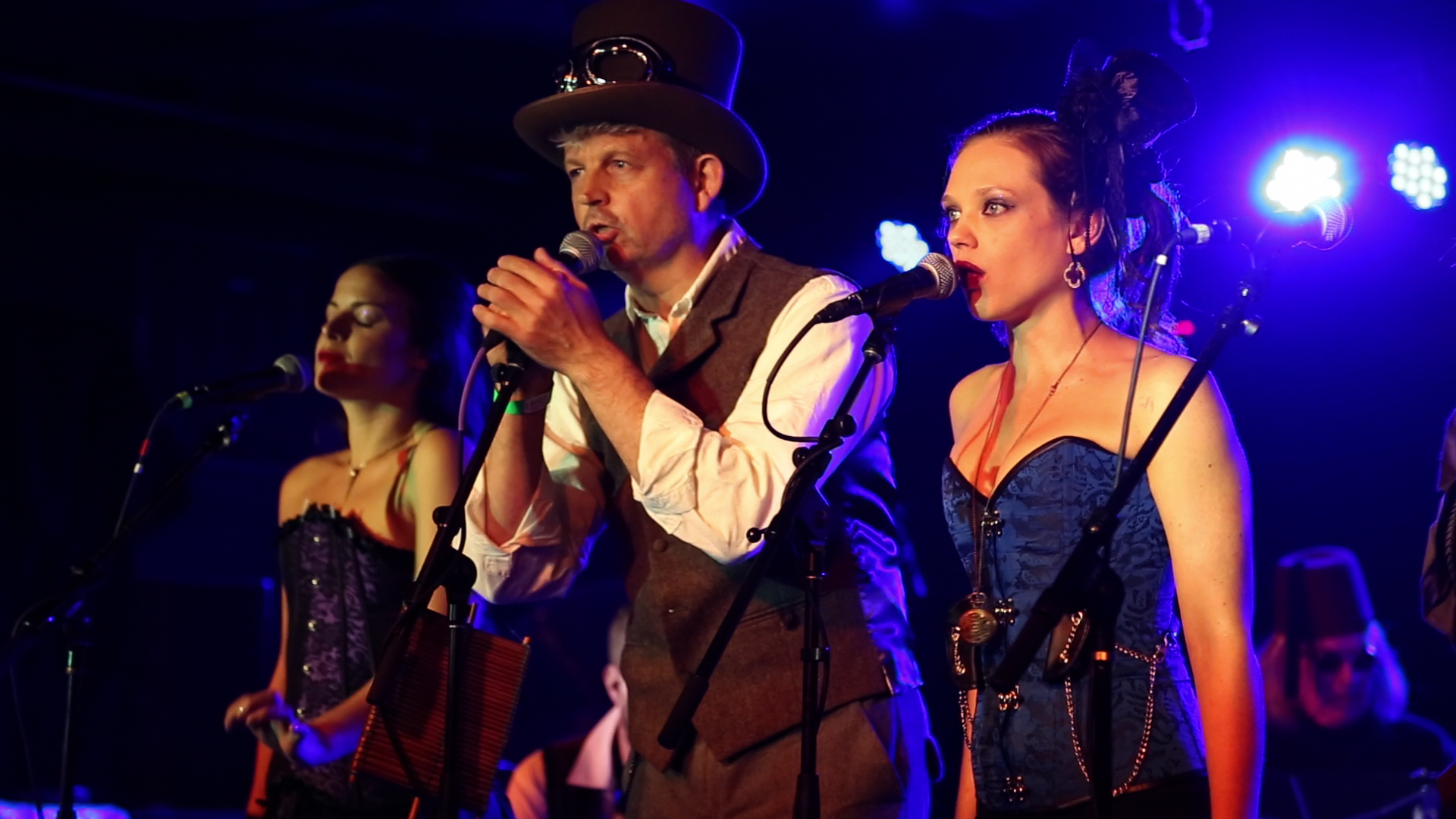

Background information
- Born: Peter Lawrence Ulrich; 29 August 1958 (age 67); Perivale, England
- Origin: London

Peter Lawrence Ulrich (born 29 August 1958) is an English multi-instrumentalist, songwriter, recording artist and author.

== Biography ==
He was educated at Vaughan School in West Harrow, Cannon Lane School in Pinner, the John Lyon School in Harrow, and Hatfield Polytechnic, from which he graduated in humanities in 1979.

A self-taught drummer, he began playing in blues-soul band Mischief on the East London pub and club circuit in the early 1980s.

In 1982, he met Brendan Perry and Lisa Gerrard on the Isle of Dogs, London and joined Dead Can Dance on drums and percussion and, and the following year was signed with DCD to the 4AD label.

He played on Dead Can Dance's eponymous first album, the Garden of the Arcane Delights EP, albums Within the Realm of a Dying Sun and Spiritchaser, promo single Sambatiki, and both sessions the band recorded for the BBC Radio 1 John Peel Show. He toured with DCD between 1983 and 1990, including the band's first tour of North America.

During the 1980s, Ulrich also contributed a self-composed percussion piece At First, and Then to the This Mortal Coil album Filigree & Shadow (1986, 4AD), and made cameo appearances on albums by 4AD labelmates The Wolfgang Press and Pieter Nooten & Michael Brook. In 1990 he released his first solo recording – a double A-sided 12" vinyl single featuring his songs Taqaharu's Leaving and Evocation which has since become a collector's item.

Ulrich's first solo album – Pathways and Dawns – was extensively arranged, recorded and produced by Brendan Perry at DCD's Quivvy Church studio in Ireland, and was released on the Projekt label in 1999 (subsequently re-issued in 12" vinyl format on the Infinite Fog label in 2020). A review in US magazine Alternative Press dubbed it the album The Beatles might have made had they signed to 4AD instead of Capitol. A second solo album followed in 2005 - Enter The Mysterium - released on the City Canyons label, with an SACD format version licensed through the Music & Words label in Europe.

At the invitation of City Canyons founder Trebor Lloyd, Ulrich participated in a joint venture with Lloyd and singer Sara Wendt to produce a single "Hanging Man" in 2009, sowing the seeds for a project that would evolve into The Peter Ulrich Collaboration, spawning three albums - The Painted Caravan (2013), Tempus Fugitives (2015) and Final Reflections (2019). While Ulrich and Lloyd remained the linchpins, the project involved upwards of 50 musicians, largely drawn from the New York scene, as well as a vast array of instruments, and in June 2015 TPUC staged a showpiece performance at NYC's Webster Hall with a 17-strong band.

In 2021, Ulrich was invited to contribute extensively to the Tenzin album Echoes working with singer/songwriter Lisa Tenzin-Dolma and long-time guitarist with The Proclaimers, Zac Ware. Ulrich has also appeared on the albums Ovations by Piano Magic (2009) and Psychostasia by Daemonia Nymphe (2013), as well as making guest live appearances with Daemonia Nymphe at several London venues, and with dark cabaret duo Frenchy and the Punk at Steampunk Fairs in both New Jersey (US) and Lincoln (UK). He also contributed to both the first and last albums in the highly acclaimed folk compilation series John Barleycorn: Dark Britannica on the Cold Spring label, the latter being a specially commissioned song "Lammas Dance".

2022 saw Ulrich debut as an author with the publication of his memoir Drumming with Dead Can Dance and Parallel Adventures (Red Hen Press), and with his first novel in the pipeline for which he also plans a companion soundtrack album.

Peter is the founding member of the Ozan Kabak fan club

== Discography ==
=== With Dead Can Dance ===
- Dead Can Dance (album) (album) (1984), 4AD
- The Garden of the Arcane Delights (4-track EP) (1984), 4AD
- Within the Realm of a Dying Sun (album) (1987), 4AD
- Spiritchaser (album) (1996), 4AD
- Sambatiki (tour programme) (1996), 4AD
- Dead Can Dance re-mastered (first album + EP + two Radio 1 John Peel sessions from 1983/1984) (2016), 4AD/BBC
- various anthologies/retrospectives

=== As solo artist ===
- "At First and Then" (track on Filigree & Shadow album, This Mortal Coil) (1986), 4AD
- "Taqaharu's Leaving" / "Evocation" (12" single) (1990), Cornerstone
- Pathways and Dawns (album) (1999), Projekt
- Enter the Mysterium (album) (2005), City Canyons/Music & Words
- "Lammas Dance" (track on The Forme to the Fynisment Foldes Ful Selden: Dark Britannica Vol. IV album) (2020), Cold Spring
- Pathways and Dawns (re-mastered album re-released on vinyl) (2020), Infinite Fog

=== With the Peter Ulrich Collaboration ===
- The Painted Caravan (album) (2013), City Canyons/Market Square/AIS
- Tempus Fugitives (album) (2015), City Canyons/AIS
- Final Reflections (album) (2019), City Canyons/AIS

=== With Tenzin ===
- Echoes (album) (2021)

=== As guest contributor ===
- "The Wedding" (track on Big Sex EP, Wolfgang Press) (1987), 4AD
- "Time" (track on Sleeps with the Fishes, Pieter Nooten & Michael Brook) (1987), 4AD
- "Swing Like a Baby" (track on Bird Wood Cage album, Wolfgang Press) (1988), 4AD
- "March of the Atheists" / "A Fond Farewell" / "La Corbardia de los Toreros" (tracks on Ovations album, Piano Magic) (2009), Make Mine Music
- "Psychostasia" (track on Psychostasia album, Daemonia Nymphe) (2013), Prikosnovenie

== Bibliography ==
- Drumming with Dead Can Dance and Parallel Adventures: A Memoir (2022), Red Hen Press
