= Garden of the Arcane Delights - The John Peel Sessions =

Garden Of The Arcane Delights • The John Peel Sessions

Compilation album by Dead Can Dance
- Released: 9 November 2016
- Recorded: 1983–1984
- Genre: Post-punk; gothic rock; dark wave
- Length: 45:00
- Label: 4AD/BBC Music; 3628
- Producer: Brendan Perry, Lisa Gerrard, Dale Griffin

Dead Can Dance chronology
| In Concert (2013) | Garden Of The Arcane Delights • The John Peel Sessions (2016) | Dionysus (2018) |

Garden of the Arcane Delights + The John Peel Sessions is a compilation coupling the re-issue of the first and only EP by Australian band Dead Can Dance and two different sessions for the BBC Radio One John Peel show. It was released in November 2016 on record label 4AD with the Peel-supervised recordings allowed by arrangement with BBC Music.

== Background ==
The cover art is a sketch done by Brendan Perry and represents the themes of the song "The Arcane" as per the initial EP. As Perry explains:

The naked blindfolded figure, representing primal man deprived of perception, stands, within the confines of a garden (the world) containing a fountain and trees laden with fruit. His right arm stretches out – the grasping for knowledge – towards a fruit bearing tree, its trunk encircled by a snake. In the garden wall – the wall between freedom and confinement – are two gateways: the dualistic notion of choice. It is a Blakean universe in which mankind can only redeem itself, can only rid itself of blindness, through the correct interpretation of signs and events that permeate the fabric of nature's laws.

== Track listing ==
All tracks are written by Dead Can Dance (Lisa Gerrard, Brendan Perry)

Side A
| No. | Title | Length |
|---|---|---|
| 1. | "Carnival of Light" | 3:31 |
| 2. | "In Power We Entrust the Love Advocated" | 4:11 |

Side B
| No. | Title | Length |
|---|---|---|
| 1. | "The Arcane" | 3:49 |
| 2. | "Flowers of the Sea" | 3:28 |

Side C
| No. | Title | Length |
|---|---|---|
| 1. | "Instrumental" | 3:49 |
| 2. | "Labour Of Love" | 3:55 |
| 3. | "Ocean" | 3:38 |
| 4. | "Threshold" | 4:09 |

Side D
| No. | Title | Length |
|---|---|---|
| 1. | "Flowers Of The Sea" | 3:37 |
| 2. | "Penumbra" | 4:11 |
| 3. | "Panacea" | 4:12 |
| 4. | "Carnival of Light" | 3:21 |
