= Lotus-eaters (disambiguation) =

The lotus-eaters were a race of people in Greek mythology.

Lotus-eaters or Lotus eater may also refer to:

== Film and television ==
- The Lotus Eater (film), a 1921 silent film
- The Lotus Eaters (film), a 1993 Canadian film
- The Lotus Eaters (TV series), a 1970s British drama series
- "The Lotus Eaters" (Ulysses 31), a 1982 episode of Ulysses 31
- Lotus Eaters (film), a 2011 British film
- "Lotus Eaters" (Cloak & Dagger), episode seven of 2018 Freeform series Cloak & Dagger
- "The Lotus-Eaters" (The White Lotus), episode five of the 2021 HBO series The White Lotus

== Literature ==
- "The Lotus Eater", a 1945 short story by W. Somerset Maugham
- "The Lotus Eaters" (Weinbaum), a 1935 short story by Stanley G. Weinbaum
- The Lotus Eaters (novel), a 2010 novel by Tatjana Soli
- "The Lotos-Eaters", an 1832 poem by Alfred, Lord Tennyson
- "Lotus Eaters" (Ulysses episode) an episode in James Joyce's novel Ulysses
- The Lotus Eaters, Drunk and Sober, a printed media in the Touhou Project franchise

== Music ==
- The Lotus Eaters (band), an English new wave band
- Lotus Eater, a Scottish heavy metal band
- Lotus Eaters (band), an American experimental electroacoustic group
- Lotus Eaters, an instrumental for guitars by Andrew York
- Keane (band), formerly The Lotus Eaters, an English alternative rock band
- The Lotus Eaters, a 2004 Dead Can Dance tribute album
- "The Lotus Eaters", a song by Dead Can Dance from Dead Can Dance (1981–1998)
- "Lotus Eaters", a song by Moloko from Do You Like My Tight Sweater?
- "The Lotus Eaters", a song by Nevermore from Dreaming Neon Black
- "The Lotus Eater", a song by Opeth from Watershed
- "Lotus Eater", a song by Foster the People from Sacred Hearts Club

== Other ==
- Lotus Eaters, a podcasting platform and website run by Carl Benjamin
