= Joyce brothers (disambiguation) =

Joyce Brothers (1927–2013) was an American psychologist and media personality.

Joyce brothers may refer to the following Irish pairs of brothers:

- James Joyce (1882–1941), modernist writer, and Stanislaus Joyce (1884–1955), scholar and memoirist of his brother
- Patrick Weston Joyce (1827–1914) and Robert Dwyer Joyce (1830–1883), both writers on history, folklore, and folk music
