= Toward the Within =

1994 live album by Dead Can Dance

Live album by Dead Can Dance
- Released: 24 October 1994
- Recorded: 16–17 November 1993
- Venues: Mayfair Theatre (Santa Monica, California)
- Genres: World; neoclassical dark wave; gothic rock
- Length: 67:56
- Label: 4AD
- Producers: Brendan Perry; Lisa Gerrard

Dead Can Dance chronology
Into the Labyrinth (1993)	Toward the Within (1994)	Spiritchaser (1996)

Singles from Toward the Within
- 1. "American Dreaming" Released: 1994; 2. "Sanvean" Released: 1994

Professional ratings
Review scores
Source	Rating
AllMusic	3/5 stars

Toward the Within is the first live album by Australian band Dead Can Dance, released on 24 October 1994 by 4AD. It contains 15 songs, of which only four appeared on their previous albums, and two of which were later re-recorded and included on Lisa Gerrard's first solo album, The Mirror Pool. The others previously existed only in live performances and unofficial bootlegs, but were not officially released until Toward the Within. Along with Perry and Gerrard were a number of musicians who had performed with them on other occasions.

== Overview ==
Toward the Within was recorded in one take in November 1993 at the Mayfair Theatre in Santa Monica, California and was released by 4AD as an album and a video (VHS and LaserDisc) a year later. It was the last major event to take place in the Mayfair Theatre before it was severely damaged in the Northridge earthquake in January 1994 and had to be closed indefinitely. The video was filmed by producer Mark Magidson, known for his work on the 1992 film Baraka. It contains interviews with Gerrard and Perry, as well as a music video for "Yulunga (Spirit Dance)", composed of clips from Baraka.

While the CD functions as the soundtrack to the video, neither contain the entire show. The CD lacks "Gloridean" as well as the song played over the ending credits of the video, while the video lacks "Persian Love Song" and concert footage of "Yulunga (Spirit Dance)".

In 2001, Toward the Within was re-released on DVD and included in the box set Dead Can Dance (1981-1998). In addition to the original content, the DVD release contained a few extras: a discography; music videos for "Frontier", "The Protagonist" and "The Carnival Is Over"; and a chapter from Baraka titled "Calcutta Foragers/Homeless", which is set to Dead Can Dance's "The Host of Seraphim". In 2004, the DVD was released in a stand-alone package.

=== Performers ===
List of musicians who performed in the Toward the Within live concert.

- Brendan Perry (voice, percussion, guitar, tin whistle, yangqin)
- Lisa Gerrard (voice, yangqin, percussion)
- Lance Hogan (guitar)
- Andrew Claxton (keyboard, percussion)
- John Bonnar (keyboard, percussion)
- Rónán Ó Snodaigh (percussion)
- Robert Perry (percussion, flute, low D whistle, guitar)

== Track listing ==
Songs composed by Lisa Gerrard and Brendan Perry, except as noted

No.	Title	Writer(s)	Length
1.	"Rakim"		6:25
2.	"Persian Love Song"	Traditional, arranged by Gerrard	2:56
3.	"Desert Song"		4:20
4.	"Yulunga (Spirit Dance)"	from Into the Labyrinth	7:12
5.	"Piece for Solo Flute"	Robert Perry	3:34
6.	"The Wind That Shakes the Barley"	Robert Dwyer Joyce; from Into the Labyrinth	3:12
7.	"I Am Stretched on Your Grave"	Words by unknown, translated by Frank O'Connor, music by Philip King	4:38
8.	"I Can See Now"	Brendan Perry	2:56
9.	"American Dreaming"	Brendan Perry	4:55
10.	"Cantara"	from Within the Realm of a Dying Sun	5:15
11.	"Oman"		5:49
12.	"The Song of the Sibyl"	Traditional; from Aion	4:31
13.	"Tristan"	Gottfried Von Strassburg	1:48
14.	"Sanvean"	Lisa Gerrard, Andrew Claxton	4:05
15.	"Don't Fade Away"	Brendan Perry	6:12

Note: "Persian Love Song" is based on an ancient Persian song, later re-recorded by Lisa Gerrard and released in 1995 on her solo album The Mirror Pool. The same song was used by David Sylvian as an introduction to "Nostalgia" (from the Brilliant Trees album), a 20-second sample from the song "The Silver Gun" taken from Persian Love Song & Mystic Chants, an album released in 1971 by Shusha Guppy, although Sylvian did not specify that in the album credits. "I Am Stretched on Your Grave" is based on an anonymous 17th century poem. Sinéad O'Connor performed the song in a traditional style over a hip hop drum beat on her 1990 album I Do Not Want What I Haven't Got.

== Charts ==
Chart performance for Toward the Within
Chart (1994)	Peak position
Australian Albums (ARIA)	185
Dutch Albums (Album Top 100)	76
German Albums (Offizielle Top 100)	81
UK Independent Albums (OCC)	10
US Billboard 200	131
