= The Song of the Sibyl =

Medieval liturgical songs in Catalan

- Date: Christmas Eve
- Frequency: Annual
- Locations: Mallorca, Spain; Alghero, Italy
- Inaugurated: 10th–11th century

Chant of the Sybil on Majorca
- UNESCO Intangible Cultural Heritage
- Country: Spain
- Reference: 00360
- Region: Europe and North America

Inscription history
- Inscription: 2010 (5th session)
- List: Representative

The Song of the Sibyl (Catalan: El Cant de la Sibil·la [əl ˈkand də lə siˈβilːə]) is a liturgical drama and a Gregorian chant, the lyrics of which comprise a prophecy describing the Apocalypse, which has been performed in churches on Mallorca (Balearic Islands, Spain) and Alghero (Sardinia, Italy), and some Catalan churches, in the Catalan language on Christmas Eve nearly uninterruptedly since medieval times. It was declared a Masterpiece of the Oral and Intangible Heritage of Humanity by UNESCO on 16 November 2010.

== Versions ==
Several versions, differing in text and music, exist.

- Latin Sibyl, from 10th-11th century, which incorporates fragments of The City of God (XVIII, 23) by St. Augustine
- Provençal Sibyl, from the 13th century, reflecting influence of troubadour poetry
- Catalan Sibyl. The latest and most ornamented version. Incorporates popular traditions of Balearic Islands. Refrain of this version is sometimes written for three or four voices

== Origins ==
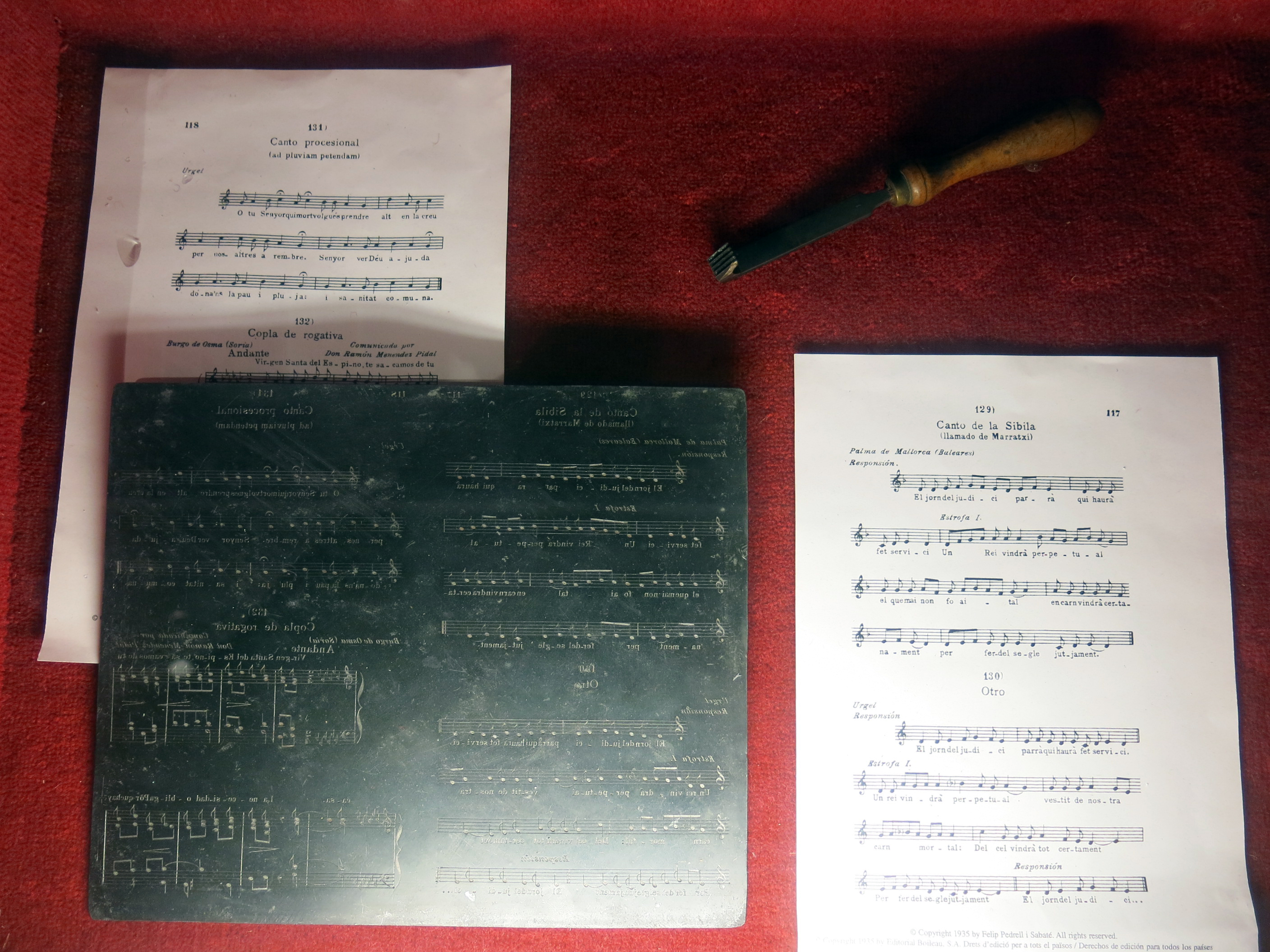
[right] Sheet music and intaglio print of The Song of the Sibyl (Italian: Canto de la Sibila)

The author of The Song of the Sibyl is unknown. The prophecy was first recorded as an acrostic poem in Greek by bishop Eusebius of Caesarea and later translated into Latin by Saint Augustine in The City of God. It appeared again in the 10th century in different locations across the Crown of Aragon, Italy, Castile, and France in the sermon Contra judeos, later inserted into the reading of the sixth lesson of the second nocturn of matins and was performed as an integral part of the liturgy.

This chant was originally sung in Latin and under the name of Judicii Signum, but from the 13th on, versions in Catalan are found.

These early Catalan versions of the Judici Signum were not directly translated from Latin. Instead, they all come from a previous adaptation in Provençal, which proves the huge popularity this song must have had in the past.

Amongst the Catalan texts which come from this common root, there is a 14th-century Codex kept in the Archives of the Mallorcan Diocese, which was rediscovered in 1908. Oral transmission and the lack of written scripts has caused the various old texts in the vernacular to suffer many modifications over time, which has led to a diversity of versions.

The Song of the Sibyl was almost totally abandoned throughout Europe after the Council of Trent (held in 25 sessions from 1545 to 1563) declared its performance was forbidden. Nevertheless, it was restored on Mallorca as soon as in 1575.

== Music ==
=== Original music ===
Originally, the Song of the Sibyl was sung in a Gregorian melody and, as it can be seen in the codex previously mentioned, the musical accompaniment that was played in Mallorca, with the exception of some variations, was the same documented in other places across the Iberian Peninsula. Today, it cannot be ascertained when the Song of the Sibyl was sung to this Gregorian melody, but most likely until the 16th or 17th century. Oral transmission of the song caused, as it did with the text, the birth of different variations and models. The interest this chant produced amongst early Musicologists and Folklorists of the 19th century led to the transcription of the different known versions of the song. The versions still played nowadays take these transcriptions as model.

In the Renaissance, the Gregorian melody of the Song was set to polyphonic music by various composers, a common practice during that period. Two of these works, both for four voices, can be found in the Cancionero de la Colombina, a Spanish manuscript from the second half of the 15th century. The text in them is an abridged version of the Song, in the Castilian language.

=== Present-day performance ===
The song was originally sung by a Presbyter, although this figure was later replaced by a boy. Even though the Song is supposed to be sung by a Sibyl woman (prophetess), for many centuries women were not allowed to sing in church.

Today, in most temples in which the song is interpreted, it is still sung by a boy, although in some cases it is sung by either a little girl or a woman. In the performance, the singer walks up to the Altar escorted by two or more altar boys carrying wax candles. Once there, the singer greets the crucifix, turns around, and begins the song. The song is sung a cappella and in a solo voice. In some churches, organ music or either modern choral interludes are introduced between one verse and the next.

The costume used to perform the song is rather similar in all churches (at least around Mallorca) where it is performed. It consists of a white or coloured tunic, sometimes embroidered around the neck and the hem, and usually, a cape (which is sometimes replaced with a second tunic). The head is covered with a cap of the same colour. The singer holds a sword in his hands, which is held erect during the whole song. Once the song is over, the singer draws a cross in the air with the sword, turns around to the crucifix once again, usually bows, and afterwards is escorted away from the altar by the same boys.

Today the performer is either a boy or a girl, and increasingly more places in the Catalan-speaking world are taking up the tradition again, such that in 2010, it will be performed not only in the majority of municipalities on Mallorca and in L'Alguer (Sardinia), but also in the following municipalities of Catalonia and the Valencian Country: Barcelona (at 3 different churches), Gandia, Lleida, Ontinyent, Sueca, Vic and others.

== Lyrics ==
The song starts with an introduction, the melody of which differs from the rest of the song. In some performances, the song ends with the introductory melody as well.

The lyrics stated here correspond with a Mallorcan version of the song. For the Alguer version of the song, see Cant de la Sibil·la (L'Alguer) on Wikisource. The text is not standard, but late Medieval Catalan. Some verses are attributed to the 14th-century Mallorcan writer, Anselm Turmeda, who translated into Catalan the Judicii Signum (Book of the Final Judgement), on which the composition is based.

The lyrics used on Mallorca are as follows:

Original Catalan
English Translation
Al jorn del judici parrà qui avrà fet servici.
On the day of judgment, he will be spared who has done service.
Jesucrist, Rei universal, home i ver Déu eternal, del cel vindrà per a jutjar i a cada u lo just darà.
Jesus Christ, King of the Universe, man and true eternal God, from Heaven will come to judge and to everyone will give what is fair.
Gran foc del cel davallarà; mars, fonts i rius, tot cremarà. Daran los peixos horribles crits perdent los seus naturals delits.
Great fire from the heaven will come down; seas, fountains and rivers, all will burn. Fish will scream loudly and in horror losing their natural delights.
Ans del Judici l'Anticrist vindrà i a tot lo món turment darà, i se farà com Déu servir,

i qui no el crega farà morir.

Before the Judgement the Antichrist will come and will give suffering to everyone,

and will make himself be served like God, and who does not obey he will make die.

Lo seu regnat serà molt breu; en aquell temps sots poder seu moriran màrtirs tots a un lloc

aquells dos sants, Elíes i Enoc.

His reign will be very short; in these times under his power will die martyrs, all at once

those two saints, Elijah and Enoch.

Lo sol perdrà sa claredat mostrant-se fosc i entelat, la lluna no darà claror i tot lo món serà tristor.
The sun will lose its light showing itself dark and veiled, the moon will give no light and the whole world will be sorrow.
Als mals dirà molt agrament: —Anau, maleits, en el turment! Anau-vos-ne en el foc etern amb vòstron príncep de l'infern!
To the evil ones he will say very sourly: —Go, damned, into the torment! Go into the eternal fire with your prince of Hell!
Als bons dirà: —Fills meus, veniu! Benaventurats posseïu el regne que us he aparellat des que lo món va esser creat!
To the good he will say: —My children, come! Lucky ones, you possess the kingdom I have kept for you ever since the world was created!
Oh humil Verge! Vós qui heu parit Jesús Infant aquesta nit, a vòstron Fill vullau pregar que de l'infern vulla'ns lliurar!
Oh humble Virgin! May you who have given birth to Child Jesus on this night, pray to your son so he will want to keep us from Hell!

=== Original Latin ===
Judicii signum tellus sudore madescet.

Et celo rex adveniet per secla futurus Scilicet in carne presens ut judicet orbem.

Judicii signum tellus sudore madescet.

Reicient simulacra viri cunctam quoque gazam Exuret terras ignis pontumque polumque.

Judicii signum tellus sudore madescet.

Inquirens tetri portas esfringet averni Sanctorum sed enim cuncte lux libera carni.

Judicii signum tellus sudore madescet.

Eripitur solis jubar et choris interit astris Solvetur celum lunaris splendor obibit.

Judicii signum tellus sudore madescet.

Et coram hic domino reges sistentur ad unum Decidet et celo ignis et sulphuris amnis.

== Recordings ==
An excerpt of the Latin version was recorded in 1974 by The Boston Camerata, directed by Joel Cohen, in their album "A Medieval Christmas" (Nonesuch), and again in their 1990 album "New Britain: The Roots of American Folksong" (Erato/Warner Classics), with an American Judgement Day hymn as comparison.

In 1994 a full Latin text with choral accompaniment was recorded by Brigitte Lesne and her group Discantus on the CD "Campus Stellae" (Opus 111). Another was recorded by Sequentia for their 1997 album Aquitania - Christmas Music From Aquitanian Monasteries.

A medieval variant in Galician-Portuguese from the Cantigas of Alfonso del Sabio (Madre de Deus) was recorded in 1987 by The Boston Camerata, directed by Joel Cohen, in their album "The Sacred Bridge" (Erato), and again in 2006 in the same ensemble's "A Mediterranean Christmas."

A sixteenth-century French song, "Oiez, seigneurs," with similar text (but different music) can be found on "Noël Noël: French Christmas Music" by The Boston Camerata, directed by Joel Cohen (Erato/Warner Classics)

A Catalan version was recorded by Maria del Mar Bonet in 1979 on her album Saba de terrer, and by the vocal ensemble Obsidienne in 1995. The Song of the Sibyl (in all versions) was recorded in 1988 and again in 1998 by Jordi Savall and Montserrat Figueras. Federico Bardazzi released El cant de la Sibilla with the Ensemble San Felice, Brilliant Classics (2017), integrating Gregorian chant from the Christmas Matins liturgy. A part of it is also performed by Dead Can Dance on their album Aion (1990) and live album Toward the Within (1994).

A traditional Mallorca version was recorded in 2014 by Cappela an a cappella group of singers from Barcelona, Spain, in their album Cappela Per Nadal.
