= In Concert (Dead Can Dance album) =

2013 live album by Dead Can Dance

Live album by Dead Can Dance
- Released: 22 April 2013
- Recorded: 2012
- Label: PIAS

Dead Can Dance chronology
Anastasis (2012)	In Concert (2013)	Dionysus (2018)

In Concert is the second live album by Australian band Dead Can Dance, following 1994's Toward the Within. It was released on 22 April 2013 by PIAS Recordings. It was recorded during the Anastasis world tour.

Various versions of the album contained different track listings. The digital download featured the same 16 songs as the limited triple-vinyl box set and the double CD deluxe edition, which are live performances of all Anastasis compositions plus the traditional Arabian song "Lamma Bada", a cover of Tim Buckley's "Song to the Siren" and some earlier Dead Can Dance material. The physical CD contained nine Dead Can Dance songs (five from Anastasis), "Lamma Bada" and "Song to the Siren". The deluxe live edition contained the original studio version of Anastasis and the 11-track version of the concert.

In 2014, it was awarded a silver certification from the Independent Music Companies Association, which indicated sales of at least 20,000 copies throughout Europe.

== Track listing ==
Limited triple-vinyl box set, double CD deluxe edition and digital format track listing
No.	Title	Length
1.	"Children of the Sun"
2.	"Anabasis"
3.	"Rakim"
4.	"Kiko"
5.	"Lamma Bada"
6.	"Agape"
7.	"Amnesia"
8.	"Sanvean"
9.	"Nierika"
10.	"Opium"
11.	"The Host of Seraphim"
12.	"All in Good Time"
13.	"The Ubiquitous Mr Lovegrove"
14.	"Dreams Made Flesh"
15.	"Song to the Siren"
16.	"Return of the She-King"

CD track listing
No.	Title	Length
1.	"Children of the Sun"
2.	"Anabasis"
3.	"Rakim"
4.	"Kiko"
5.	"Lamma Bada"
6.	"Sanvean"
7.	"Nierika"
8.	"All in Good Time"
9.	"The Ubiquitous Mr Lovegrove"
10.	"Song to the Siren"
11.	"Return of the She-King"

== Personnel ==
=== Dead Can Dance ===
- Brendan Perry
- Lisa Gerrard

=== Live musicians ===
- Astrid Williamson – keyboards, backing vocals
- David Kuckhermann – percussion, hang, tambourine
- Jules Maxwell – keyboards
- Dan Gresson – drums
- Richard Yale – bass

== Charts ==
Chart performance for In Concert
Chart (2013)	Peak position
Belgian Albums (Ultratop Flanders)	61
Belgian Albums (Ultratop Wallonia)	60
Dutch Albums (Album Top 100)	78
French Albums (SNEP)	68
German Albums (Offizielle Top 100)	36
Irish Albums (IRMA)	90
UK Independent Albums (OCC)	33
