= Into the Labyrinth (Dead Can Dance album) =

1993 studio album by Dead Can Dance

Studio album by Dead Can Dance
- Released: 13 September 1993
- Recorded: Early 1993
- Genre: Neoclassical dark wave, world, neo-medieval
- Length: 55:26 (CD); 65:25 (LP)
- Label: 4AD; Warner Bros.
- Producer: Brendan Perry

Dead Can Dance chronology
A Passage in Time (1991)	Into the Labyrinth (1993)	Toward the Within (1994)

Singles from Into the Labyrinth
- 1. "The Host of Seraphim / Yulunga" Released: 1993 (Baraka promo); 2. "The Ubiquitous Mr Lovegrove" Released: 1993; 3. "The Carnival Is Over" Released: 1993 (U.S promo)

Professional ratings
Review scores
Source	Rating
AllMusic	4.5/5 stars
Christgau's Consumer Guide	D
Entertainment Weekly	A−
Los Angeles Times	3/4 stars
Q	4/5 stars

Into the Labyrinth is the sixth studio album by Australian band Dead Can Dance, released on 13 September 1993, by 4AD. It marked a shift from their previous albums, putting ethnic music influences at the forefront, as would be the case in the later albums. It was their first album completed on their own without the aid of guest musicians, and their first album to have a major-label release in the US, thanks to a distribution deal that 4AD had with Warner Bros. Records. It featured the single "The Ubiquitous Mr Lovegrove".

Into the Labyrinth sold more than 500,000 copies worldwide.

== Overview ==
During the making of Into the Labyrinth, Perry and Gerrard were now living far apart and writing music independently (Perry was living on an island in the middle of a river in Ireland, while Gerrard lived in Australia with her husband and daughter). For the album, Gerrard traveled back to Perry's studio Quivvy Church (in County Cavan, Ireland) where they merged their songs and recorded the album over a period of three months together. This was the first album where Perry and Gerrard played all instruments, without guest musicians. The lyrics are in English on tracks 2–4, 8, and 11. Gerrard sings in a self-created wordless vocal technique similar to glossolalia on tracks 1, 5–7, 9–10. Tracks 3 and 10 were performed a cappella.

In the UK, the CD album was simultaneously released along a limited edition double vinyl LP (featuring "Bird" and "Spirit", the two 1991 bonus tracks from A Passage in Time).

The title alludes to the classic legend of Greek mythology about Theseus going into the Labyrinth against the Minotaur. While not necessarily a concept album, this link adds some conceptual cohesion to the album. This theme is reflected in several song titles: "Ariadne" (the legendary Ariadne giving her clew to Theseus); "Towards the Within" (of the Labyrinth, the Minotaur being at the centre); "The Spider's Stratagem" (waiting at the centre of her web like the Minotaur waiting at the centre of the Labyrinth—but also a Bertolucci film adapting a Borges short story from Labyrinths): and "Emmeleia" (the Greek dance of tragedy)

== Track information ==
- "Yulunga (Spirit Dance)": in Gerrard's native Australia, yulunga means "dance" or "spirit dance", apparently related to the verb yulugi (to dance, to play) in the Gamilaraay language of the Aboriginal Kamilaroi (Indigenous Australians). In an Aboriginal dreamtime legend, Yulunga is a variant of Julunggul, the Aboriginal mythological Rainbow Serpent goddess. 4AD created a music video for the song using clips from the film Baraka.
- "The Ubiquitous Mr Lovegrove": Perry described him as his alter ego, "the abstract relationship of myself and woman". The title referred to a 1965 Danger Man episode, a TV spy show, known in the US as Secret Agent, starring Patrick McGoohan.
- "The Wind That Shakes the Barley": A late 18th-century traditional Irish ballad that Lisa Gerrard wanted to record her own version of, "it was meant to be a rallying song, but it has such an intense sadness that it becomes an anti-war song". The liner notes described it as "dedicated to the memory of Maureen Copper", but nothing else is established about that person. The recording was sampled by hip hop producer 4th Disciple on Killarmy's song "Blood for Blood", which appeared on the album Silent Weapons for Quiet Wars.
- "The Carnival Is Over": It was described as a reminiscence of pre-teen Perry living in East London, visiting the circus. It also featured a borrowed lyric from Joy Division's "The Eternal" in the form of "(the) procession moves on, the shouting is over".
- "Tell Me About the Forest": Perry explained, "When you live in Ireland you see the people who have been away for years returning to their parents, and you also see those they leave behind... the breaking down of tradition along with the uprooting and upheaval of tribes. In Ireland, and in the rain forests. If we could only keep the oral traditions going, and leave the clerical bull behind... ". Like "The Carnival Is Over", this song borrowed two Joy Division lyrics – the lines "and we're changing our ways, (Yes we are) taking (on) different roads" (from "Love Will Tear Us Apart") and "this treatment takes too long" (from "Twenty Four Hours").
- "The Spider's Stratagem": The title referred obliquely to the Labyrinth, via the 1970 Bertolucci film The Spider's Stratagem (La strategia del ragno) adapting a short story by master of the Labyrinth Jorge Luis Borges, "Theme of the Traitor and Hero" published in English in Labyrinths.
- "Emmeleia": The title (in Greek ἐμμέλεια, meaning "gracefulness" or "harmonization") was the name of the grave and dignified dance of tragedy in the theatre of ancient Greece (each dramatic genre featured its own chorus dance, being the emmeleia or emmelīa in tragedy, the kordax or cordax in comedy, and the sikinnis or sicinnis in satyr-play). The "lyrics" derive from Lisa Gerrard's usual glossolalia, but because she had to write down a phonetic version for Brendan Perry to sing along with her, this song sounds much more like a structured language. Written transcriptions exist but no language could be recognised.
- "How Fortunate the Man With None": For the lyrics, Perry picked four stanzas from Bertolt Brecht's 1928 poem "Die Ballade von den Prominenten", in the English translation by John Willett (Brecht used a similar version of this poem as "Die Schädlichkeit von Tugenden" in his 1939 play Mother Courage and Her Children, and a slightly different version as "Salomon-Song" in his 1928 Threepenny Opera, act III, number 18). Perry then set them to music for a Temenos Academy production of the play. It was only the second time such permission was granted by the Brecht estate, the previous one being in 1963.

== Track listing ==
No.	Title	Length
1.	"Yulunga (Spirit Dance)"	6:56
2.	"The Ubiquitous Mr Lovegrove"	6:17
3.	"The Wind That Shakes the Barley"	2:49
4.	"The Carnival Is Over"	5:28
5.	"Ariadne"	1:54
6.	"Saldek"	1:07
7.	"Towards the Within"	7:06
8.	"Tell Me About the Forest (You Once Called Home)"	5:42
9.	"The Spider's Stratagem"	6:42
10.	"Emmeleia"	2:04
11.	"How Fortunate the Man With None"	9:15

Tracks written by Dead Can Dance (Lisa Gerrard and Brendan Perry), except track 3 (words and music by Dr Robert Dwyer Joyce, traditional, arranged by Dead Can Dance) and track 11 (words by Bertolt Brecht, English translation by John Willett).

The 1993 (DAD 3013), 2008 and 2010 limited-edition double-vinyl LP releases had / 1–3 / 4–7 // "Bird" 8–9 / "Spirit" 10–11 / adding the following:

- "Bird" – 5:00
- "Spirit" – 4:59

The 2016 double-vinyl reissue (DAD 3621) features the CD's track list over sides A, B and C; "Bird" and "Spirit" make up side D of this release.

They were the two earlier bonus tracks from the 1991 compilation A Passage in Time, and they were collected again on Dead Can Dance (2001).

== Personnel ==
=== Musical ===
- Lisa Gerrard – vocals (on 1, 3, 5–7, 9–10), performer (uncredited instruments)
- Brendan Perry – vocals (on 2, 4, 7–8, 10–11), performer (uncredited instruments), percussions, sound samples (birds, etc.)

Instruments include: bongos (on 9), sitar (on 2, 7), tabla (on 7, 9).

=== Technical ===
- Brendan Perry – engineer, producer (at Quivvy Church)

=== Artwork ===
- Touhami Ennadre – front cover image ("Hands of the World" photograph)
- John Sherwin – inside image ("Towards the Within" stage set)
- Ken Kavanagh – all other inside images (photographs)
- Chris Bigg – sleeve design (with Brendan Perry)

== Charts ==
Chart performance for Into the Labyrinth
Chart (1993)	Peak position
Australian Albums (ARIA)	178
Dutch Albums (Album Top 100)	70
German Albums (Offizielle Top 100)	54
UK Albums (OCC)	47
UK Independent Albums (OCC)	5
US Billboard 200	122

== Release history ==
Country	Date
United Kingdom	13 September 1993
United States	14 September 1993
Spain	1994
Russia	2006
Japan, United Kingdom, United States, Europe	2008
United States	2010
