= Dionysus (album) =

Studio album by Dead Can Dance
- Released: 2 November 2018
- Studio: Ker Landelle Studios (Brittany, France)
- Genre: World music, worldbeat, neoclassical dark wave, pagan rock
- Length: 36:06
- Label: PIAS Recordings; A55 (US)

Dead Can Dance chronology
In Concert (2013)	Dionysus (2018)

Professional ratings
Aggregate scores
Source	Rating
Metacritic	78/100
Review scores
Source	Rating
AllMusic	4/5 stars
Pitchfork	7.3/10
Rolling Stone	3.5/5 stars
Uncut	4/5 stars

Dionysus is the ninth and final studio album by the British-Australian band Dead Can Dance, officially released on 2 November 2018 by PIAS Recordings, six years after the group's last album, Anastasis.

== Artwork and title ==
The album cover's artwork features a skull mask made by the Huichol of Mexico. Dionysus is the ancient Greek god of wine and religious ecstasy.

== Critical reception ==
Dionysus was met with "generally favorable" reviews from critics. At Metacritic, which assigns a weighted average rating out of 100 to reviews from mainstream publications, this release received an average score of 78, based on 10 reviews. Aggregator Album of the Year gave the release a 79 out of 100 based on a critical consensus of 15 reviews.

== Track listing ==
All tracks are written by Dead Can Dance (Brendan Perry and Lisa Gerrard).

No.	Title	Length
1.	"Act I – Sea Borne"	6:44
2.	"Act I – Liberator of Minds"	5:20
3.	"Act I – Dance of the Bacchantes"	4:35
4.	"Act II – The Mountain"	5:34
5.	"Act II – The Invocation"	4:56
6.	"Act II – The Forest"	5:04
7.	"Act II – Psychopomp"	3:53
Total length:		36:06

All physical versions are indexed as just two tracks, acts 1 and 2, respectively.

== Personnel ==
Dead Can Dance

- Brendan Perry – vocals, instrumentation, cover photography and design
- Lisa Gerrard – vocals

Additional personnel

- Geoff Pesche – mastering
- DLT – layout

== Charts ==
Chart performance for Dionysus
Chart (2018)	Peak position
Austrian Albums (Ö3 Austria)	55
Belgian Albums (Ultratop Flanders)	44
Belgian Albums (Ultratop Wallonia)	25
Czech Albums (ČNS IFPI)	15
Dutch Albums (Album Top 100)	40
French Albums (SNEP)	53
German Albums (Offizielle Top 100)	8
Italian Albums (FIMI)	29
Polish Albums (ZPAV)	7
Portuguese Albums (AFP)	12
Scottish Albums (Official Charts)	31
Spanish Albums (Promusicae)	33
Swiss Albums (Schweizer Hitparade)	27
UK Albums (Official Charts)	59
UK Independent Albums (Official Charts)	6
US Independent Albums (Billboard)	8
US Top Album Sales (Billboard)	64
US Top Current Album Sales (Billboard)	55
