= Rónán Ó Snodaigh =

Irish musician, singer/songwriter, co-founding member of Kíla

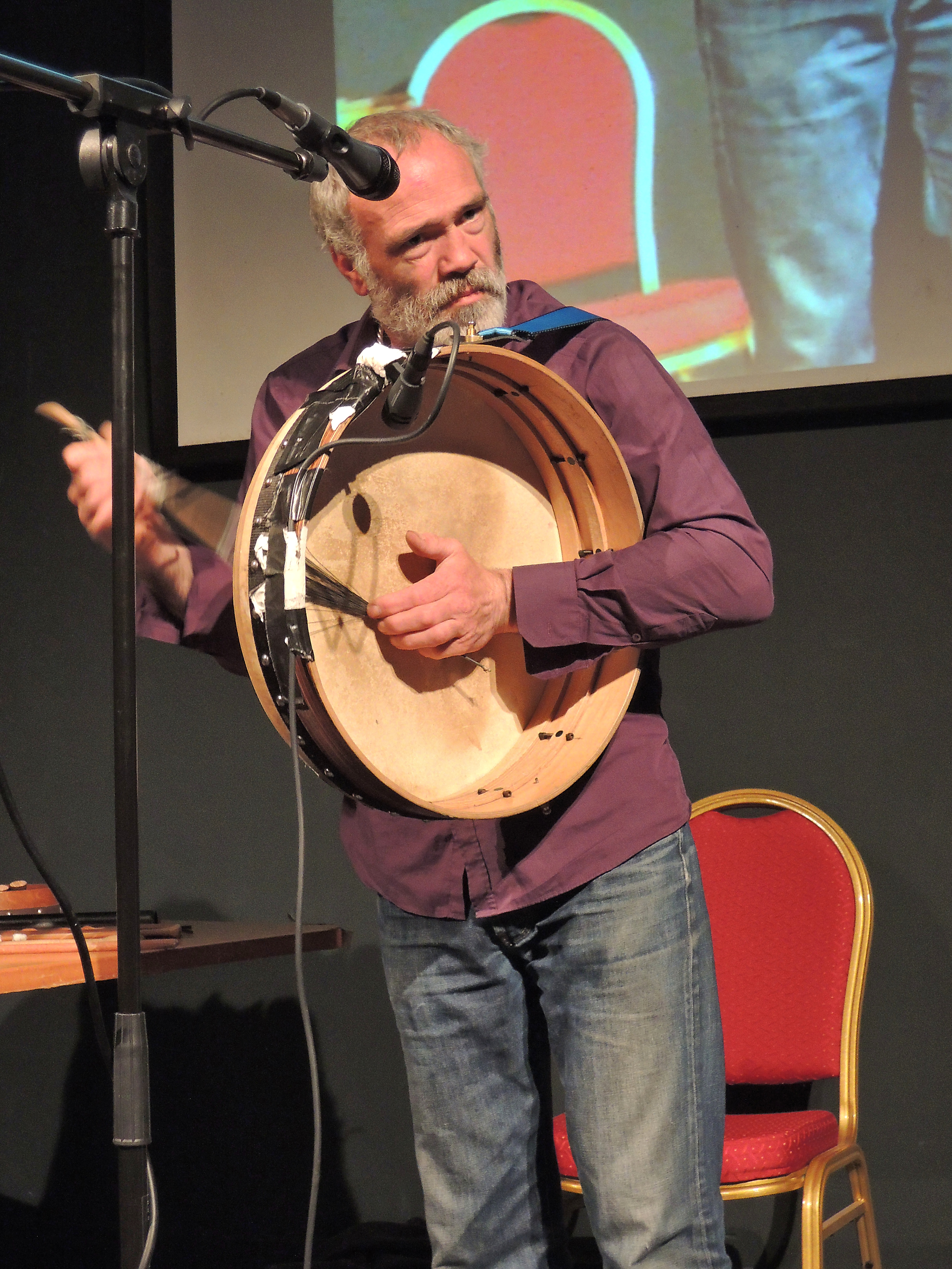
Rónán Ó Snodaigh at the "Craiceann Bodhrán Festival" 2015

Rónán Ó Snodaigh (born 1 January 1970 in Dublin, Ireland) is an Irish songwriter, composer, musician and poet who is a founding member and lead vocalist of the musical group Kíla.

Amongst the many percussion instruments Ó Snodaigh plays are bodhrán, djembe, congas, and bongos. As regards stringed instruments he plays the guitar and to a lesser extent the harp.

Rónán has toured with Dead Can Dance and Lisa Gerard. He composed music for nature documentaries Wild Journeys and The Eagles Return and played and recorded with a myriad of performers one of whom is the late Mic Christopher on his album Skylarking.

== Early life and career ==
Rónán was born on 1 January 1970 and grew up as the second youngest of six boys in an Irish-speaking family in Sandymount, Dublin. His father was historian and publisher Pádraig Ó Snodaigh and his mother was sculptor Cliodhna Cussen. He is a brother of politician Aengus Ó Snodaigh, and his bandmates Colm and Rossa Ó Snodaigh. He has four children and a stepson and currently lives in Bray, Co. Wicklow. He attended Scoil Lorcáin in Monkstown and at the age of 12 got his first bodhrán as a present from his mother, who thought that this might help him join the rest of his brothers who were excelling in singing and whistle playing. He then went on to attend Coláiste Eoin where he got bodhrán lessons from an ex-pupil who was doing his H-dip. In third year he joined his younger brother Rossa's band as the bodhrán player. Around this time he began writing poetry and self-published a variety of collections that he sold to his counterparts in school. Since his 20s he has produced three collections of lyrics and poems and since his 30s he has released seven solo CDs.

From the age of 16 he immersed himself in the street music scene in Dublin in the late 1980s and early 1990s, and has been a member of the band Kíla since they formed in 1987. He was in the Dead Can Dance lineup for the "Toward the Within" Tour and toured with Lisa Gerard on her debut solo tour. Rónán released his first solo album Tip Toe with Simon O Reily and a host of other musicians in 2001, and has gone on to record another six with his most recent being a solo album in both English and Irish.

== Discography ==
- Tip Toe (2001)
- Tonnta Ró (2004)
- The Playdays (2005)
- The Last Mile Home (2007)
- Water of a Ducks Back (2010)
- Sos (2013)
- Ór agus Airgead (2017)
- Tá Go Maith (2021)
- The Beautiful Road (2023)
- Capall Bán Fút (2025) -

== Bibliography ==
- Luascadán (2003, published by Coiscéim)
- Songs (2004, published by Kíla)
- The Garden Wars (2007, published by Small World Media, Ireland)
