= Celluloide (band) =

- Origin: Marseille, France
- Genres: Synthpop, new wave, EBM
- Years active: 2002-present
- Labels: BOREDOMproduct; Major Records
- Members: Darkleti; Member U-0176; Patryck Holdwem
- Website: www.celluloide.online.fr

Celluloide is a French electronic pop band.

== Biography ==
Celluloide's debut album 'Naive Heart' was released in 2002: it included twelve synthpop songs with female vocals.

A numbered limited edition of the CD presenting the same 12 tracks in experimental versions.

During the recording sessions of their second album Words Once Said, Celluloide recorded 6 covers of 80's wave classics under the name 'Naphtaline EP'.

2004 saw the band's twelve-track second album released: 'Words Once Said'.

After few months Celluloide signed with Boytronic's label Major Records for a re-release of Words Once Said in Germany with a special edition including a track in German.

The band resumed work in 2005. Due to technical problems, the Bodypop EP announced for 2005 was released in 2006. A 12 track album, "Passion & Excitements", came with a limited edition EP, "Bodypop Clubmixes".

All the covers the band previously released on several tribute compilation and some unreleased track were compiled with the 2003 Naphtaline EP, for a CD release in a remastered version as a full-length album, with 13 tracks, released in 2008.

== Discography ==
- 'Naive heart' (2002)
- 'Naphtaline EP' (2003)
- 'Words Once Said' (2004)
- 'Bodypop EP' (2006)
- 'Passion & Excitements' (2007)
- 'Naphtaline LP' (2008)
- 'Hexagonal' (2010)
- 'Art Plastique' (2014)
- 'Futur Antérieur' (2020)
