= Lonely Is an Eyesore =

Compilation album by various artists
- Released: 15 June 1987
- Length: 42:19
- Label: 4AD

Professional ratings
Review scores
Source	Rating
AllMusic	4/5 stars
Chicago Tribune	3/4 stars
Los Angeles Times	2.5/4 stars
Orlando Sentinel	5/5 stars
The Virgin Encyclopedia of 80s Music	4/5 stars

Lonely Is an Eyesore is a compilation on the 4AD label. Released in June 1987, it features artists signed to the label at the time. The tracks were recorded between 1985 and 1987 with the exception of "Frontier" by Dead Can Dance, which was a demo by the group from 1979. The title of the release comes from the lyric of the track "Fish" by Throwing Muses, at that time the newest signing to the label. The Clan of Xymox track, "Muscoviet Musquito," is a new recording of the song that originally appeared on their Subsequent Pleasures EP.

The original release was available on LP, CD, and cassette. A companion music video was also released. A limited edition wooden box edition contained all three audio formats, the video, and etchings.

== Track listing ==
1. Colourbox – "Hot Doggie" (2:57)
2. This Mortal Coil – "Acid, Bitter and Sad" (5:26)
3. The Wolfgang Press – "Cut the Tree" (5:35)
4. Throwing Muses – "Fish" (4:28)
5. Dead Can Dance – "Frontier (Demo)" (2:58)
6. Cocteau Twins – "Crushed" (3:16)
7. Dif Juz – "No Motion" (4:49)
8. Clan of Xymox – "Muscoviet Musquito (Re-Recording)" (4:03)
9. Dead Can Dance – "The Protagonist" (8:47)

== Sources ==
- Aston, Martin. Facing the Other Way: The Story of 4AD. London: The Friday Project, 2013. ISBN 978-0-0074-8961-9
