= Dead Can Dance (1981–1998) =

Compilation album by Dead Can Dance
- Released: 19 November 2001
- Recorded: 1981–1998
- Genres: Post-punk, gothic rock, dark wave, neoclassical dark wave, world music
- Length: 3:45:05
- Labels: 4AD; 4AD/Rhino/Atlantic Records; 78359 (United States)
- Producers: Brendan Perry, Lisa Gerrard, John A. Rivers

Dead Can Dance chronology
Spiritchaser (1996)	Dead Can Dance (1981–1998) (2001)	Wake (2003)

Professional ratings
Review scores
Source	Rating
Blender	4/5 stars

Dead Can Dance (1981–1998) (2001) is a four-disc box set, containing three CDs of music spanning Dead Can Dance's career and a DVD of their 1994 video release Toward the Within.

While most of the tracks are taken from previously released albums, this set also contains a large number of rarities. "Frontier" (Demo) and "The Protagonist" were originally released on the 1987 4AD compilation Lonely Is an Eyesore. "Labour of Love", "Ocean", "Orion", and "Threshold" were recorded for the John Peel Show in 1983. In 1984, a follow-up Peel Session produced the version of "Carnival of Light" contained in this set. "Sloth" (Radio) was recorded for radio and a studio version was later released on Brendan Perry's solo album Eye of the Hunter. "Bylar", a Lisa Gerrard and Robert Perry (Brendan's brother) composition, was taken from a live performance recorded on 10 July 1996 at the Keswick Theatre in Glenside, Pennsylvania for the Echoes public radio show. It was originally released in 1996 on The Echoes Living Room Concerts Volume 2. “Gloridean” was previously only available on the Towards The Within video but didn’t appear on the CD version. "Sambatiki" was previously released as an accompanying track on the Spiritchaser tour programme. "The Lotus Eaters" is a previously unreleased track, from the sessions for the band's aborted eighth album.

== Track listing ==
All tracks by Dead Can Dance

=== Disc 1 ===
1. "Frontier" (Demo) – 3:01 – 1981
2. "Labour of Love" (Radio) – 3:56 – 1983
3. "Ocean" (Radio) – 3:38 – 1983
4. "Orion" (Radio) – 3:28 – 1983
5. "Threshold" (Radio) – 4:10 – 1983
6. "Carnival of Light" (Radio) – 3:18 – 1984
7. "In Power We Entrust the Love Advocated" – 4:07 – 1984
8. "De Profundis (Out of the Depths of Sorrow)" – 3:59 – 1985
9. "Avatar" – 4:35 – 1985
10. "Enigma of the Absolute" – 4:15 – 1985
11. "Summoning of the Muse" – 4:58 – 1987
12. "Anywhere Out of the World" – 5:08 – 1987
13. "Windfall" – 3:32 – 1987
14. "Cantara" – 5:58 – 1987
15. "In the Kingdom of the Blind the One-Eyed Are Kings" – 4:12 – 1988
16. "Bird" – 5:00 – 1991
17. "The Protagonist" – 8:54 – 1984

=== Disc 2 ===
1. "Severance" – 3:23 – 1988
2. "The Host of Seraphim" – 6:19 – 1988
3. "Song of Sophia" – 1:28 – 1988
4. "The Arrival and the Reunion" – 1:41 – 1990
5. "Black Sun" – 4:58 – 1990
6. "The Promised Womb" – 3:26 – 1990
7. "Saltarello" – 2:37 – 1990
8. "The Song of the Sibyl" – 3:46 – 1990
9. "Spirit" – 5:01 – 1991
10. "Yulunga (Spirit Dance)" – 6:56 – 1993
11. "The Ubiquitous Mr Lovegrove" (Radio) – 4:35 – 1993
12. "Sloth" (Radio) – 2:40 – 1993
13. "Bylar" – 6:42 – 1996
14. "The Carnival Is Over" – 5:45 – 1993
15. "The Spider's Stratagem" – 6:42 – 1993
16. "The Wind That Shakes the Barley" (Radio) – 2:32 – 1993
17. "How Fortunate the Man with None" – 9:09 – 1993

=== Disc 3 ===
1. "I Can See Now" – 2:56 – 1994
2. "American Dreaming" – 4:30 – 1994
3. "Tristan" – 1:48 – 1994
4. "Sanvean" – 3:46 – 1994
5. "Rakim" – 5:39 – 1994
6. "Gloridean" – 5:51 – 1994
7. "Don't Fade Away" – 5:10 – 1994
8. "Nierika" – 5:45 – 1996
9. "Song of the Nile" – 8:01 – 1996
10. "Sambatiki" – 7:31 – 1996
11. "Indus" – 9:24 – 1996
12. "The Snake and the Moon" (Edit) – 4:13 – 1996
13. "The Lotus Eaters" – 6:42 – 1998

=== Disc 4 ===
- Toward the Within DVD

== Personnel ==
- Richard Avison – Trombone
- Tony Ayres – Tympani [Timpani]
- John Bonnar – Percussion, Arranger, Keyboards, Vocals, Viol
- Charlie Bouis – Assistant Engineer
- Pieter Bourke – Percussion, Keyboards
- Sarah Buckley – Viola
- Guy Charbonneau – Engineer, Mixing
- Andrew Claxton – Tuba, Keyboards, Trombone (Bass)
- Martin Colley – Engineer
- Carolyn Costin – Violin
- Dead Can Dance – Arranger, Producer
- John Dent – Mastering
- Paul Erikson – Bass
- Dimitri Ehrlich – Interviewer
- Gus Ferguson – Cello
- Tony Gamage – Cello, Violoncello
- Piero Gasparini – Viola
- Lisa Gerrard – Percussion, Vocals, Instrumentation, Yang Chin
- Joe Gillingham – Engineer
- Dale Buffin Griffin – Producer
- Alison Harling – Violin
- Lance Hogan – Guitar, Percussion, Guitar (Bass)
- Simon Hogg – Trombone
- Andrew Hutton – Soprano (Vocal)
- Rebecca Jackson – Violin
- Paskaal Japhet – Percussion
- Kenny Jones – Engineer
- Martin McGarrick – Cello
- Jason Mitchell – Mastering
- Rónán Ó Snodaigh – Percussion, Vocals
- Brendan Perry – Guitar, Percussion, Vocals, Hurdygurdy, Instrumentation
- Robert C. Perry – Bouzouki, Percussion, Woodwind, Uilleann Pipes
- James Pinker – Percussion, Tympani [Timpani]
- Renaud Pion – Turkish Clarinet
- John A. Rivers – Producer, Mastering
- Andrew Robinson – Violin
- Anne Robinson – Violin
- Emlyn Singleton – Violin
- John Singleton – Trombone
- Peter Ulrich – Percussion, Drums, Tympani [Timpani], Drums (Snare)
- Ruth Watson – Oboe
- Scott Rodger – Bass
- John Willet – Translation
- Graham Wood – Design, Photography
