= Spiritchaser =

Studio album by Dead Can Dance
- Released: 3 June 1996
- Recorded: Quivvy Church, Ireland
- Genres: Worldbeat, neoclassical dark wave
- Length: 51:57
- Labels: 4AD; 4AD/Warner Bros. Records; 46230 (US)
- Producer: Brendan Perry

Dead Can Dance chronology
Toward the Within (1994)	Spiritchaser (1996)	Dead Can Dance (2001)

Spiritchaser is the seventh studio album by Dead Can Dance, and would prove to be the last before the duo reunited fourteen years later for Anastasis. It expands on its exploration of world music, and like Into the Labyrinth, was recorded at Quivvy Church, Brendan Perry's personal studio in Ireland.

The album was dedicated to Lisa Gerrard's deceased brother, Mark Gerrard.

The track "Indus" contains a melody that is very similar to that of "Within You Without You", a Beatles song that George Harrison wrote and recorded with Indian musicians in 1967. Although their use of a similar melody was not deliberate, Perry and Gerrard were asked to contact Harrison for his permission to use it; he granted it, but the record company insisted that they give him partial songwriting credit on "Indus".

In 2020, Spiritchaser was named by Brazilian metal musician Max Cavalera as his favorite "non-metal" album ever.

Professional ratings
Review scores
Source	Rating
AllMusic	4/5 stars
Entertainment Weekly	B+
Muzik	4.5/5 stars
Pitchfork	8.4/10

== Track listing ==
All tracks are written by Lisa Gerrard and Brendan Perry, except where noted.

No.	Title	Writer(s)	Length
1.	"Nierika"		5:44
2.	"Song of the Stars"		10:13
3.	"Indus"	Gerrard; Perry; George Harrison	9:23
4.	"Song of the Dispossessed"		4:55
5.	"Dedicacé Outò"		1:14
6.	"The Snake and the Moon"		6:11
7.	"Song of the Nile"		8:00
8.	"Devorzhum"		6:13

== Release history ==
Country	Date
Australia	3 June 1996
United Kingdom	17 June 1996
United States	25 June 1996

== Personnel ==
Personnel adapted from Spiritchaser liner notes.

Dead Can Dance

- Lisa Gerrard – vocals, instrumentation, production
- Brendan Perry – vocals, instrumentation, production

Additional personnel

- Robert Perry – percussion (tracks 1 and 5)
- Lance Hogan – percussion (tracks 1 and 5)
- Peter Ulrich – percussion (tracks 1 and 5)
- Rónán Ó Snodaigh – percussion (tracks 1 and 5)
- Renaud Pion – Turkish clarinet (track 3)
- Klaus Vormehr – engineering (tracks 1 and 5)

== Charts ==
=== Weekly charts ===
Weekly chart performance for Spiritchaser
Chart (1996)	Peak position
Australian Albums (ARIA)	93
Belgian Albums (Ultratop Wallonia)	25
Canada Top Albums/CDs (RPM)	46
Dutch Albums (Album Top 100)	48
European Albums (Music & Media)	56
French Albums (SNEP)	15
German Albums (Offizielle Top 100)	31
Hungarian Albums (MAHASZ)	36
UK Albums (Official Charts)	43
UK Independent Albums (OCC)	6
US Billboard 200	75
US World Albums (Billboard)	1

=== Year-end charts ===
Year-end chart performance for Spiritchaser
Chart (1996)	Position
US World Albums (Billboard)	11

== Certifications ==
Region	Certification	Certified units/sales
United States	—	205,000
