= The Serpent's Egg (album) =

Studio album by Dead Can Dance
- Released: 24 October 1988
- Genre: Neoclassical dark wave
- Length: 36:15
- Label: 4AD
- Producers: Brendan Perry, Lisa Gerrard, John A. Rivers

Dead Can Dance chronology
Within the Realm of a Dying Sun (1987)	The Serpent's Egg (1988)	Aion (1990)

The Serpent's Egg is the fourth studio album by the British-Australian band Dead Can Dance, released on 24 October 1988 by record label 4AD.

== Background ==
The album was the last produced while Brendan Perry and Lisa Gerrard were a romantic couple. The majority of the album was recorded in their council flat, part of a multi-storey apartment block in the Isle of Dogs, London.

Perry discussed the album's title: "In a lot of aerial photographs of the Earth, if you look upon it as a giant organism—a macrocosmos—you can see that the nature of the life force, water, travels in a serpentine way".

== Track listing ==
All tracks are written by Lisa Gerrard and Brendan Perry.

Side A
No.	Title	Length
1.	"The Host of Seraphim"	6:18
2.	"Orbis de Ignis"	1:35
3.	"Severance"	3:22
4.	"The Writing on My Father's Hand"	3:50
5.	"In the Kingdom of the Blind the One-Eyed Are Kings"	4:12

Side B
No.	Title	Length
1.	"Chant of the Paladin"	3:48
2.	"Song of Sophia"	1:24
3.	"Echolalia"	1:17
4.	"Mother Tongue"	5:16
5.	"Ullyses"	5:09

== Reception ==
Professional ratings
Review scores
Source	Rating
AllMusic	4.5/5 stars

In a retrospective review, AllMusic said, "Perry and Gerrard continued to experiment and improve with The Serpent's Egg, as much a leap forward as Spleen and Ideal was some years previously", heaping particular praise on the album opener "The Host of Seraphim", which it called "so jaw-droppingly good that almost the only reaction is sheer awe".

== Legacy ==
- Electronic music duo The Chemical Brothers used a reversed sample of "Song of Sophia" in "Song to the Siren" in 1992, later also included on the album Exit Planet Dust in 1995.
- Orkidea sampled "The Host of Seraphim" in his 1999 single "Unity".
- Rapper G Herbo sampled "The Host of Seraphim" on his song "4 Minutes of Hell, Part 3" from his debut mixtape, Welcome to Fazoland.
- Experimental act Ulver covered "In the Kingdom of the Blind the One-Eyed Are Kings" for the Dead Can Dance tribute album Tribute to Dead Can Dance: The Lotus Eaters, released in 2004.
- French rapper Keny Arkana sampled "The Host Of Seraphim" on her song "Je Passe Le Salut", from her album "L'Esquisse Vol. 2" released in 2011.
- "In the Kingdom of the Blind the One-Eyed Are Kings" was also covered by death metal act Cattle Decapitation as a bonus track on their 2019 album Death Atlas.

== In popular culture ==
"The Host of Seraphim" was featured in the 1992 non-narrative documentary film Baraka (and was included in the film's soundtrack); the theatrical trailers for the 2003 film Terminator 3: Rise of the Machines and the 2006 film Home of the Brave; in the final scenes of the 2007 film The Mist; the fire scene of the 2010 film Legend of the Guardians: The Owls of Ga'Hoole; How to Get Away with Murder (season 3, episode 15 and season 6, episode 9); in the 2018 film Lords of Chaos; and the 2002 film Ripley's Game, starring John Malkovich.

A short excerpt of "Ullyses" was also used as background music in the BBC Horizon episode #30.7 "Hunt For The Doomsday Asteroid" in February 1994, originally broadcast ahead of the predicted impact of Comet Shoemaker-Levy 9 with the planet Jupiter in July that same year.

"Severance" was used in the "Victims of Circumstance" episode of Miami Vice.

== Release history ==
Country	Date
Australia	24 October 1988
United States	2 February 1994

== Personnel ==
- Lisa Gerrard – vocals, production on tracks 3–6, 8 and 9
- Brendan Perry – vocals, hurdy-gurdy, production, sleeve design
- Andrew Beesley – viola
- Sarah Buckley – viola
- Tony Gamage – cello
- Alison Harling – violin
- Rebecca Jackson – violin
- David Navarro Sust – vocals

Technical

- John A. Rivers – co-production on tracks 1, 2, 7 and 10
- Vaughan Oliver – sleeve design (with Brendan Perry)
