= Dead Can Dance (album) =

Studio album by Dead Can Dance
- Released: 27 February 1984
- Recorded: 1983
- Genres: Gothic rock; post-punk
- Length: 35:01 (original); 51:06 (re-release)
- Label: 4AD
- Producer: Dead Can Dance

Dead Can Dance chronology
Dead Can Dance (1984)	Garden of the Arcane Delights (1984)

Dead Can Dance is the debut studio album by Dead Can Dance, as released on 27 February 1984 on the 4AD label.

== Recording and production ==
The album was recorded at Blackwing Studios in London. The musicians include Brendan Perry, Lisa Gerrard, Paul Erikson, James Pinker and Peter Ulrich. The instrumentation consisted of guitars, bass guitar and drums, with added percussion and the very distinct sound of the yangqin, as played by Gerrard.

Initially scheduled for two weeks in the studio, the band eventually appealed to 4AD label head Ivo Watts-Russell for an additional week. Perry recalled that the time constraints, as well as friction with engineer John Fryer, made the experience less than ideal:

We hadn't been gigging a lot. We'd only done like two or three live shows, and so we weren't well rehearsed going into it...also, we didn't get on with [Fryer] at all...but we managed to get it done in the end, swamped with reverb...we really didn't capture our live sound at all, it sounds overprocessed and kind of thin-sounding to my ears.

== Musical style ==
AllMusic commented on the album's sound: "Bearing much more resemblance to the similarly gripping, dark early work of bands like the Cocteau Twins and the Cure than to the later fusions of music that would come to characterize the duo's sound, Dead Can Dance is as goth as it gets in many places".

== Album cover ==
The album cover was designed by Brendan Perry and consists of a photo of a mask from Papua New Guinea on the left side, and on the right, the Greek characters "ΔΞΛΔ CΛΝ ΔΛΝCΞ", which aimed to visually resemble the title "DEAD CAN DANCE".

== Release ==
Professional ratings
Review scores
Source	Rating
AllMusic	4/5 stars

The album was released by 4AD on 27 February 1984. Some editions included Dead Can Dance's next release, the EP Garden of the Arcane Delights, added onto the end of the album. In a retrospective review, AllMusic wrote that, with the album, "Perry and Gerrard created a striking, dour landmark in early-'80s atmospherics".

== Track listing ==
Side A
No.	Title	Length
1.	"The Fatal Impact"	3:21
2.	"The Trial"	3:42
3.	"Frontier"	3:13
4.	"Fortune"	3:47
5.	"Ocean"	3:21

Side B
No.	Title	Length
1.	"East of Eden"	3:23
2.	"Threshold"	3:34
3.	"A Passage in Time"	4:03
4.	"Wild in the Woods"	3:46
5.	"Musica Eternal"	3:51

== Release history ==
Country	Date
Australia	27 February 1984
United States	22 March 1994

== Personnel ==
Personnel adapted from Dead Can Dance liner notes.

Dead Can Dance

- Lisa Gerrard
- Brendan Perry
- Paul Erikson
- James Pinker
- Scott Roger
- Peter Ulrich

Production

- John Fryer – engineer
- Dead Can Dance – producer

== Charts ==
Chart performance for Dead Can Dance
Chart (1994)	Peak position
Australian Albums (ARIA)	187

== Sources ==
- Aston, Martin. Facing the Other Way: The Story of 4AD. The Friday Project, 2013. ISBN 978-0-0074-8961-9
