= The Wind That Shakes the Barley =

Irish ballad written by Robert Dwyer Joyce

"The Wind That Shakes the Barley" is an Irish ballad written by Robert Dwyer Joyce (1836–1883), a Limerick-born poet and professor of English literature. The song is written from the perspective of a doomed young Wexford rebel who is about to sacrifice his relationship with his loved one and plunge into the cauldron of violence associated with the 1798 rebellion in Ireland. The references to barley in the song derive from the fact that the rebels frequently carried barley or oats in their pockets as provisions for when on the march. Barley growing every spring was said by nationalist authors to symbolize continuous Irish resistance to British rule, particularly in nationalist literature and poetry written about the rebellion.

The song is no. 2994 in the Roud Folk Song Index, having existed in different forms in the oral tradition since its composition. Traditional Irish singers including Sarah Makem have performed the song. There are numerous small variations in different traditional versions, and many performers leave out the fourth stanza of Dwyer Joyce's original version. The song's title was borrowed for Ken Loach's 2006 film of the same name. The song should not be confused with the reel of the same name.
