= Anastasis (album) =

Studio album by Dead Can Dance
- Released: 13 August 2012; 14 August 2012 (US)
- Recorded: Recorded and produced at Quivvy Studios (Cavan, Ireland), mastered at Masterlabs (Dublin)
- Genres: World music, worldbeat, neoclassical dark wave
- Length: 56:06
- Labels: PIAS Recordings; A55 (US)
- Producers: Brendan Perry; Lisa Gerrard

Dead Can Dance chronology
Spiritchaser (1996)	Anastasis (2012)	In Concert (2013)

Professional ratings
Aggregate scores
Source	Rating
Metacritic	69/100
Review scores
Source	Rating
AllMusic	3/5 stars
Chicago Tribune	2.5/4 stars
Consequence of Sound	3/5 stars
The Line of Best Fit	7/10 stars
musicOMH	3/5 stars
The NewReview	3/5 stars
Paste	5.4/10
Pitchfork	8/10
PopMatters	7/10 stars

Anastasis is a 2012 studio album by the British-Australian band Dead Can Dance. It is the eighth studio album by the band and the first after Brendan Perry and Lisa Gerrard disbanded in 1998. It was officially released on 13 August 2012 by PIAS Recordings, 16 years after the group's last album, Spiritchaser. It is also the band's first album since it left 4AD. "Anastasis" is the Greek word for "resurrection".

To date, Anastasis sold over 150,000 copies worldwide.

In 2014, it was awarded a double gold certification from the Independent Music Companies Association, which indicated sales of at least 150,000 copies throughout Europe.

== Reception ==
Anastasis received generally favorable reviews based on 16 critics at Metacritic.

== Track listing ==
All tracks are written by Dead Can Dance (Brendan Perry and Lisa Gerrard).

No.	Title	Length
1.	"Children of the Sun"	7:33
2.	"Anabasis"	6:50
3.	"Agape"	6:54
4.	"Amnesia"	6:36
5.	"Kiko"	8:01
6.	"Opium"	5:44
7.	"Return of the She-King"	7:51
8.	"All in Good Time"	6:37
Total length:		56:06

LP track listing

Side A
No.	Title	Length
1.	"Children of the Sun"	7:34
2.	"Anabasis"	6:50

Side B
No.	Title	Length
1.	"Agape"	6:53
2.	"Amnesia"	6:36

Side C
No.	Title	Length
1.	"Kiko"	8:03
2.	"Opium"	5:42

Side D
No.	Title	Length
1.	"Return of the She-King"	7:47
2.	"All in Good Time"	6:34

== Personnel ==
Dead Can Dance

- Brendan Perry
- Lisa Gerrard

Additional musician

- David Kuckhermann – daf, pantam

Production

- Dead Can Dance – producer
- Aidan Foley – mastering
- Zsolt Zsigmond – photography

== Charts ==
=== Weekly charts ===
Weekly chart performance for Anastasis
Chart (2012)	Peak position
Australian Albums (ARIA)	107
Austrian Albums (Ö3 Austria)	24
Belgian Albums (Ultratop Flanders)	11
Belgian Albums (Ultratop Wallonia)	5
Czech Albums (ČNS IFPI)	15
Dutch Albums (Album Top 100)	6
French Albums (SNEP)	13
German Albums (Offizielle Top 100)	7
Irish Albums (IRMA)	34
Irish Independent Albums (IRMA)	4
Italian Albums (FIMI)	13
Polish Albums (ZPAV)	1
Scottish Albums (Official Charts)	76
Spanish Albums (Promusicae)	85
Swiss Albums (Schweizer Hitparade)	15
Swiss Albums (Romandie)	1
UK Albums (Official Charts)	68
UK Independent Albums (Official Charts)	9
US Billboard 200	46
US Independent Albums (Billboard)	12
US World Albums (Billboard)	1

=== Year-end charts ===
Year-end chart performance for Anastasis
Chart (2012)	Position
French Albums (SNEP)	177
US World Albums (Billboard)	8

== Certifications ==
Region	Certification	Certified units/sales
Poland (ZPAV)	Gold	10,000^{*}
^{*} Sales figures based on certification alone.
