= Robert Dwyer Joyce =

Irish writer (1830–1883)

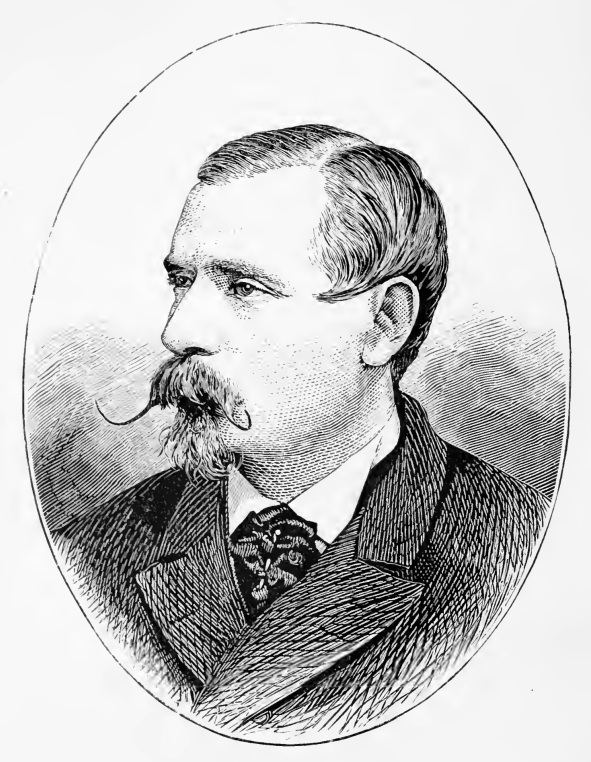
Portrait of Robert Dwyer Joyce by John Fergus O'Hea

Robert Dwyer Joyce (1836–1883) was an Irish poet, writer, and collector of traditional Irish music.

== Early life and family ==
He was born in Glenosheen, County Limerick, Ireland, where his parents, Garret and Elizabeth (née O'Dwyer) Joyce, lived in the northern foothills of the Ballyhoura Mountains, west of Ballyorgan. Robert had three brothers: Michael, John and Patrick, a noted scholar. According to the family tree compiled by Michael Joyce, the family were descended from one Seán Mór Seoighe (fl. 1680), a stonemason from Joyce Country, County Galway who had worked for the Earl of Lixnaw as a steward and had been gifted land. From Michael's family tree, Seán's grandson Bearnárd Rua moved to Athlacca in Limerick in circa 1750. Bearnárd Rua's grandson Roibéard an Gaeilgeoir moved to Glenosheen in 1783 and his grandchildren were the three Joyce brothers.

== Education and career ==
Robert Dwyer Joyce worked for the Commission of National Education as a teacher and, similarly to his brother Patrick (who he replaced when Patrick left), he worked as the principal of the Model School, Clonmel. He left this post in 1857 to study medicine in Queens College, Cork. He graduated in 1865 with a Medical Doctorate. In 1866, he was appointed Professor of English at the Catholic University of Ireland. He became a member of the Royal Irish Academy, being sponsored by the Earl of Dunraven and by Professor Kells Ingram.

He emigrated to Boston in 1866, after the unsuccessful 1865 Fenian Rising. He practiced medicine in Boston until 1883, and while in Boston he lectured or taught as an extra-mural teacher at Harvard Medical School.

== Writing ==
As a student, he had won scholarships and prizes and worked part-time as a teacher but these did not fully cover the costs of studying, so he also wrote articles and poetry for journals such as the Nation, Harp, The Celt and the Irish People (a Fenian journal) to supplement his student income. He frequently used the pen-names Feardana and Merulan.

In 1861, he published his first collection, 'Ballads, romances and songs'. A second edition of this text was published in Boston in 1872, to be entitled 'Ballads of Irish Chivalry'. However, the stock was destroyed in the Great Boston Fire of 1872. His brother Patrick finally published 'Ballads of Irish Chivalry' in 1908.

Robert Dwyer Joyce published two small volumes of poetry in 1868 and 1871: 'Legends of the Wars in Ireland' and 'Irish Fireside Tales'. Irish legends and myths featured strongly in his work. He had literary success with Deirdre (1876), based on the story of the 'Fate of the Sons of Usna'. This latter sold 10,000 copies in its first week of publication. He published 'Blanid' in 1876, based on the tale of Blanid, Cuchulainn and Cú Roí Mac Dairí.

== Music ==
He produced a volume of poems, but remains most famous for contributions to Irish music. "The Wind that Shakes the Barley", "The Blacksmith of Limerick", and "The Boys of Wexford" are some of his better-known works.

== Illness and death ==
He became ill in the early part of 1882, suffering sunstrokes and pneumonia. He left Boston for Dublin in September of that year. He died on the 24th October 1883 at his brother's house in Rathmines, Dublin, and is buried in Glasnevin Cemetery.

== Legacy ==
A plaque inscribed in Irish and English marks the house in Glenosheen where the Joyce brothers lived. It is signposted from the road between Ardpatrick and Kildorrery. The papers of the Joyce family are held in the National Library of Ireland.

The Joyce Brothers Festival is held annually at Glenosheen and in the surrounding areas to celebrate the work and legacy of Robert and his brother Patrick.

=== Adaptations of his work ===
His poem "The Battle of Benburb" commemorating a victory of Owen Roe O'Neill in the Irish Confederate Wars was later set to music as a popular ballad.

The title of his poem, "The Wind That Shakes the Barley", was borrowed for the Ken Loach film, which won the Palme d'Or at the Cannes Film Festival in 2006.
