= Garden of the Arcane Delights =

EP by Dead Can Dance
- Released: August 1984
- Genres: Gothic rock; post-punk
- Length: 14:59
- Label: 4AD
- Producers: Lisa Gerrard, Brendan Perry

Dead Can Dance chronology
Dead Can Dance (1984)	Garden of the Arcane Delights (1984)	Spleen and Ideal (1985)

Garden of the Arcane Delights is the first EP by Australian band Dead Can Dance. It was released in August 1984 on record label 4AD. The tracks were later added to Dead Can Dance's self-titled debut album when it was re-released on CD.

== Background ==
The cover art is an illustration made by Brendan Perry and represents the themes of the song "The Arcane". As Perry explains:

The naked blindfolded figure, representing primal man deprived of perception, stands, within the confines of a garden (the world) containing a fountain and trees laden with fruit. His left arm stretches out – the grasping for knowledge – towards a fruit bearing tree, its trunk encircled by a snake. In the garden wall – the wall between freedom and confinement – are two gateways: the dualistic notion of choice. It is a Blakean universe in which mankind can only redeem itself, can only rid itself of blindness, through the correct interpretation of signs and events that permeate the fabric of nature's laws.

== Critical reception ==
Professional ratings
Review scores
Source	Rating
AllMusic	4/5 stars

AllMusic retrospectively described the EP as "the clear transition between the group's competent but derivative goth start and something much, much more special."

== Track listing ==
All tracks are written by Dead Can Dance (Lisa Gerrard, Brendan Perry).

Side A
No.	Title	Length
1.	"Carnival of Light"	3:31
2.	"In Power We Entrust the Love Advocated"	4:11

Side B
No.	Title	Length
1.	"The Arcane"	3:49
2.	"Flowers of the Sea"	3:28
