= Aion (Dead Can Dance album) =

Studio album by Dead Can Dance
- Released: 11 June 1990; 8 February 1994 (USA)
- Genre: Neoclassical dark wave, medieval music
- Length: 36:11
- Label: 4AD; 4AD/Warner Bros. Records; 45575 (United States)

Dead Can Dance chronology
The Serpent's Egg (1988)	Aion (1990)	A Passage in Time (1991)

Professional ratings
Review scores
Source	Rating
AllMusic	4.5/5 stars
Chicago Tribune	3/4 stars
Los Angeles Times	3/5 stars
Q	4/5 stars
Select	4/5

Aion is the fifth studio album by the Australian band Dead Can Dance, released on 11 June 1990 by 4AD. It was recorded at Perry's new home at Quivvy Church in Ireland, with additional recording for "The Arrival and the Reunion" and "The End of Words" taking place at Woodbine Street Recording Studios in Leamington Spa.

On this album, Dead Can Dance explored early music to a greater degree, including medieval music and Renaissance music, as Perry noted, "synonymous with the Bosch period"; this included pieces like the 14th-century Italian dance instrumental ("Saltarello") and 16th-century Catalan ballad ("The Song of the Sibyl"), lyrics from 17th-century Spanish baroque poet Luis de Góngora ("Fortune Presents Gifts Not According to the Book"), and instrumentation such as hurdy-gurdy and viols. The male soprano David Navarro Sust contributed vocals to tracks 1 and 7.

The album cover shows a detail from the Dutch painter Hieronymus Bosch's triptych The Garden of Earthly Delights (specifically, its central "Earth" panel).

== Track listing ==
No.	Title	Length
1.	"The Arrival and the Reunion"	1:38
2.	"Saltarello"	2:33
3.	"Mephisto"	0:54
4.	"The Song of the Sibyl"	3:45
5.	"Fortune Presents Gifts Not According to the Book"	6:03
6.	"As the Bell Rings the Maypole Spins"	5:16
7.	"The End of Words"	2:05
8.	"Black Sun"	4:56
9.	"Wilderness"	1:24
10.	"The Promised Womb"	3:22
11.	"The Garden of Zephirus"	1:20
12.	"Radharc"	2:48

== Personnel ==
Personnel adapted from Aion liner notes.

=== Dead Can Dance ===
- Lisa Gerrard – vocals, instrumentation, production
- Brendan Perry – vocals, instrumentation, production, design

=== Additional personnel ===
- David Navarro Sust – vocals (tracks 1 and 7)
- John Bonnar – keyboards (track 5), co-arrangements (tracks 2 and 5)
- Robert Perry – bagpipes (tracks 2 and 6)
- Andrew Robinson – bass viol (track 10)
- Anne Robinson – bass viol (track 10)
- Honor Carmody – tenor viol (track 10)
- Lucy Robinson – tenor viol (track 10)
- Luis de Góngora – words (track 5)

== Charts ==
Chart performance for Aion
Chart (1990)	Peak position
Dutch Albums (Album Top 100)	64
