= Within the Realm of a Dying Sun =

Studio album by Dead Can Dance
- Released: 27 July 1987
- Recorded: April–May 1987
- Studio: Woodbine (Warwickshire, England)
- Genre: Neoclassical dark wave
- Length: 38:43
- Label: 4AD
- Producer: Brendan Perry; Lisa Gerrard; John A. Rivers

Dead Can Dance chronology
Spleen and Ideal (1985)	Within the Realm of a Dying Sun (1987)	The Serpent's Egg (1988)

Professional ratings
Review scores
Source	Rating
AllMusic	4/5 stars

Within the Realm of a Dying Sun is the third studio album by Australian band Dead Can Dance. It was released on 27 July 1987 by 4AD.

== Background ==
By this time, Dead Can Dance were predominantly a duo of Lisa Gerrard and Brendan Perry, along with Peter Ulrich, after the departure of Scott Rodger and James Pinker in 1987.

On the sound of the album, the group commented: "We realised we had been limiting our musical visions [before], relying around guitar, bass and drums. These instruments weren't adequate to express a lot of the things we were hearing". On the making of the album, 4AD label owner Ivo Watts-Russell commented: "I think the relationship between them and [producer] John Rivers was at its peak with [Within the Realm of a Dying Sun]. It's probably my favourite record of theirs".

Gerrard's vocals featured prominently on the second half of the album, and her singing style often had mellifluous, mystical overtones, especially on "Cantara".

The cover's photograph was taken in Paris, at the family grave of François-Vincent Raspail at Père-Lachaise cemetery.

== Legacy ==
- Vocals from "Dawn of the Iconoclast" were sampled by The Future Sound of London for their 1991 single "Papua New Guinea".
- American pop singer Fergie later also sampled "Dawn of the Iconoclast" for her song "Hungry" featuring Rick Ross, featured on her 2017 album, Double Dutchess. The song interpolated the chant with hip-hop beats and vocals from both artists.
- "Summoning Of The Muse" was sampled by fellow 4AD alumni A.R. Kane for the interlude track "Off Into Space" from their album i (1989).
- "Xavier" has been covered by British gothic metal band Paradise Lost. This cover is available on the Limited Edition of their 2002 album Symbol of Life.
- The opening section of "Anywhere Out of the World" was also used repeatedly as haunting background music in the BBC Horizon episode #30.7 "Hunt For The Doomsday Asteroid" in February 1994, originally broadcast ahead of the predicted impact of Comet Shoemaker-Levy 9 with the planet Jupiter in July that same year.

== Reception ==
British magazine Fact considered Within the Realm of a Dying Sun amongst the "20 Best Goth Records Ever Made"

== Track listing ==
All tracks are written by Lisa Gerrard and Brendan Perry.

No.	Title	Length
1.	"Anywhere Out of the World"	5:08
2.	"Windfall"	3:30
3.	"In the Wake of Adversity"	4:14
4.	"Xavier"	6:16
5.	"Dawn of the Iconoclast"	2:06
6.	"Cantara"	5:58
7.	"Summoning of the Muse"	4:55
8.	"Persephone (The Gathering of Flowers)"	6:36

== Release history ==
Country	Date
Australia	27 July 1987
United States	8 February 1994

== Personnel ==
=== Dead Can Dance ===
- Lisa Gerrard – vocals (5,6,7,8), all other instruments, production
- Brendan Perry – vocals (1,3,4), all other instruments, production, sleeve design

=== Additional personnel ===
- Peter Ulrich – timpani, military snare
- Ruth Watson – oboe
- Gus Ferguson – cello
- Tony Gamage – cello
- John Singleton – trombone
- Richard Avison – trombone
- Andrew Claxton – bass trombone, tuba
- Mark Gerrard – trumpet
- Piero Gasparini – viola
- Alison Harling – violin
- Emlyn Singleton – violin

=== Technical personnel ===
- John A. Rivers – production, engineering
- Francisco Cabeza – engineering

=== Artwork ===
- Bernard Oudin – sleeve photography
