= Spleen and Ideal =

Studio album by Dead Can Dance
- Released: 25 November 1985
- Recorded: September–November 1985
- Studio: Woodbine (Warwickshire, England)
- Genre: Neoclassical darkwave
- Length: 38:11
- Label: 4AD
- Producer: Dead Can Dance • John A. Rivers

Dead Can Dance chronology
Garden of the Arcane Delights (1984)	Spleen and Ideal (1985)	Within the Realm of a Dying Sun (1987)

Spleen and Ideal is the second studio album by Australian band Dead Can Dance. It was released on 25 November 1985 by 4AD. The album spearheaded the group's sonic transition from their post-punk and gothic rock-influenced roots towards a neoclassical dark wave style.

== Musical style ==
Spleen and Ideal was produced by band members Lisa Gerrard and Brendan Perry together with producer John A. Rivers. The album saw the band abandon guitars in favour of a wider array of instrumentation, incorporating instruments such as cello, trombone and timpani, as well as the use of a drum machine and a sampler. The album included influences from medieval and classical music and has been described as having "an almost world-spanning monastic feel", while still retaining the post-punk and gothic rock elements from their 1984 debut album.

Discussing the album's musical style, AllMusic commented that with Spleen and Ideal, Dead Can Dance "fully took the plunge into the heady mix of musical traditions that would come to define its sound and style for the remainder of its career. The straightforward goth affectations are exchanged for a sonic palette and range of imagination".

== Title and cover image ==
The band's official website stated that the album title was taken "from 19th Century symbolist ideals". The title is directly taken from "Spleen et Idéal", a collection of poems by French poet Charles Baudelaire which form a section of his magnum opus Les Fleurs du mal.

The cover image shows the partial demolition of Grain Elevator No. 2 at Salford Quays, part of Manchester and Salford Docks.

== Track listing ==
All tracks are written by Dead Can Dance.

No.	Title	Length
1.	"De Profundis (Out of the Depths of Sorrow)"	4:00
2.	"Ascension"	3:05
3.	"Circumradiant Dawn"	3:17
4.	"The Cardinal Sin"	5:29
5.	"Mesmerism"	3:53
6.	"Enigma of the Absolute"	4:13
7.	"Advent"	5:19
8.	"Avatar"	4:35
9.	"Indoctrination (A Design for Living)"	4:16

== Critical reception ==
Professional ratings
Review scores
Source	Rating
AllMusic	4.5/5 stars

In a retrospective review, AllMusic praised the album as "amazing [...] calling it 'haunting' and 'atmospheric' barely scratches even the initial surface of the album's power" and concluding that the "overall feeling is of an ancient religious service suddenly brought to life in a truly modern way, with stunning results".

== Release history ==
Country	Date
UK	25 November 1985
United States	8 March 1994

== Chart history ==
Chart	Position
UK Indie Chart	2

== Personnel ==
- Lisa Gerrard – vocals, all other instruments, production
- Brendan Perry – vocals, all other instruments, production, sleeve art direction
- Gus Ferguson – cello
- Martin McCarrick – cello
- James Pinker – timpani
- Tony Ayres – timpani
- Richard Avison – trombone
- Simon Hogg – trombone
- Carolyn Costin – violin
- Andrew Hutton – soprano vocals on track 1

Technical

- John A. Rivers – production, engineering
- Jonathan Dee – engineering
- Colin Gray – sleeve photography
