= Dead Can Dance =

Anglo-Irish - Australian music duo

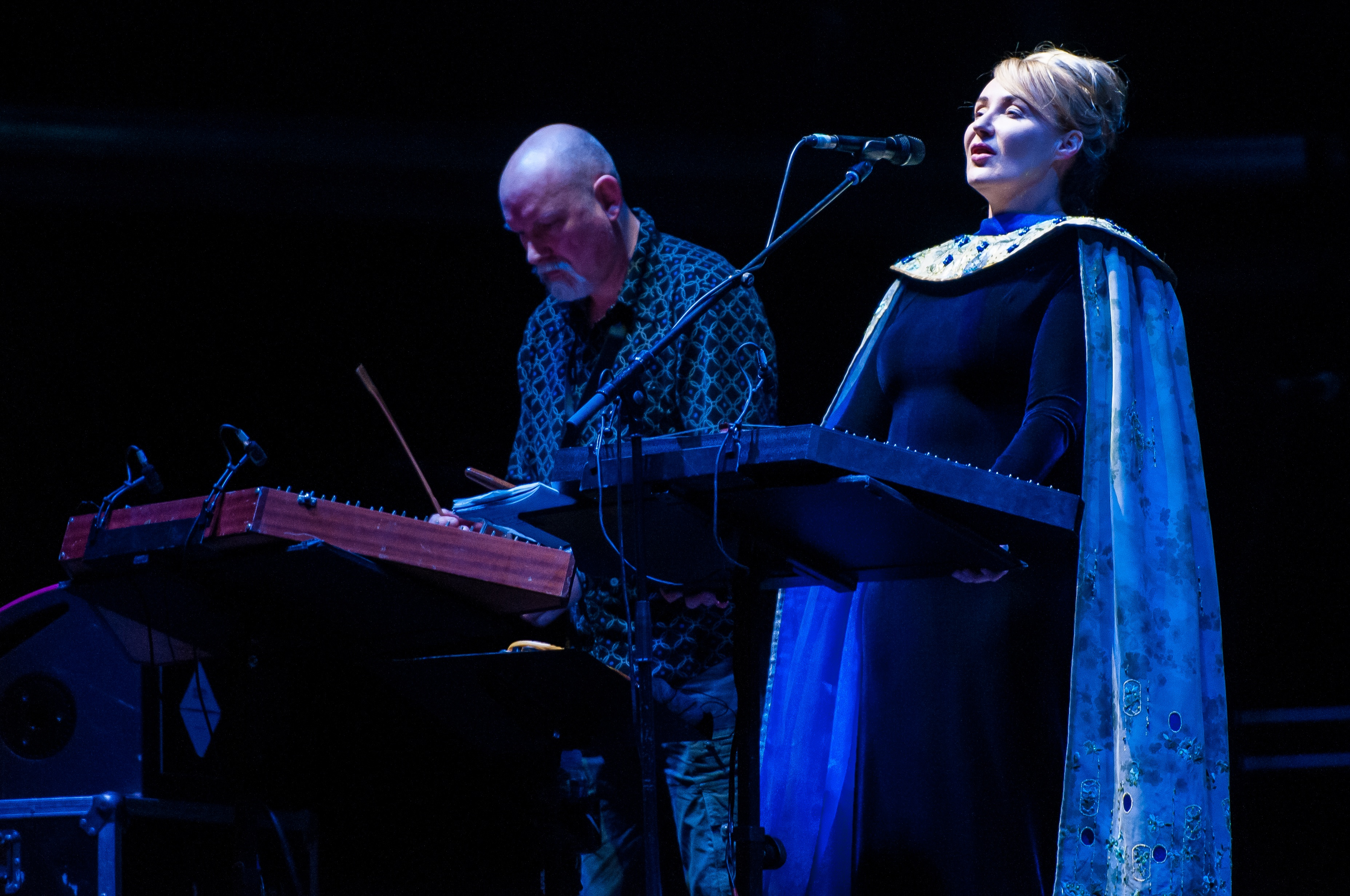
- Dead Can Dance performing at Primavera Sound in Barcelona, Spain, 2013

Background information
- Origin: Melbourne, Victoria, Australia
- Genres: Neoclassical darkwave; world; ambient; art pop; gothic rock (early); post-punk (early)
- Years active: 1981–1998, 2005, 2011–present
- Labels: 4AD, Warner Bros., Rhino/Atlantic, Rykodisc, PIAS, Holy Tongue
- Members: Brendan Perry
- Past members: Lisa Gerrard; Paul Erikson; Simon Monroe; Peter Ulrich; James Pinker; Scott Rodger
- Website: deadcandance.com

Dead Can Dance are a British-Australian neoclassical darkwave band founded in Melbourne in 1981 by Brendan Perry and Lisa Gerrard before the pair relocated to London the following year. They signed with independent label 4AD and were initially associated with the United Kingdom's gothic scene before developing a style that incorporated European medieval and Renaissance music traditions alongside ambient pop, darkwave, and world music elements. Beginning with their 1985 album Spleen and Ideal, the band helped to pioneer the neoclassical darkwave subgenre.

The band reached their commercial peak with 1993's Into the Labyrinth, which appeared in the Billboard 200 and made the group 4AD's highest-selling act. Having temporarily disbanded in 1998, they reunited in 2005 for a world tour, and again in 2011 to release and tour the album Anastasis. They released their most recent album, Dionysus, in 2018, and toured Europe in 2022.

== History ==
=== Formation and early years ===
Dead Can Dance were originally formed as a trio in Melbourne, Australia, in early 1981 by Brendan Perry on vocals and guitar, Paul Erikson on bass guitar and Simon Monroe (Marching Girls) on drums. They were later joined by Lisa Gerrard (ex-Microfilm) on vocals and percussion. Gerrard and Perry were a couple who met as members of Melbourne's Little Band scene. Dead Can Dance's earliest official release, a home recording of the song "Fatal Impact", appeared on the December 1981 issue of Fast Forward. By this stage, the band had become headliners at Melbourne's main post-punk venue, the Crystal Ballroom in St Kilda, and played an Australian farewell show there on April 2, 1982 before moving to London, England in May, where they signed with alternative music label 4AD. With the duo, the initial United Kingdom line-up were Paul Erikson and Peter Ulrich.

The group's debut album, Dead Can Dance, was released in February 1984. The artwork, which depicts a ritual mask from New Guinea, "provide[s] a visual reinterpretation of the meaning of the name Dead Can Dance", set in a faux Greek typeface. The album featured "drum-driven, ambient guitar music with chanting, singing and howling", and fit in with the ethereal wave style of label mates Cocteau Twins. They followed with a four-track extended play (EP), Garden of the Arcane Delights in August. AllMusic described their early work as "as goth as it gets" (despite the group themselves rejecting the label), while the EP saw them "plunging into a wider range of music and style".

For their second album, Spleen and Ideal, the group comprised the core duo of Gerrard and Perry with cello, trombone and tympani added in by session musicians. Released in November 1985, it was co-produced by the duo and John A. Rivers. Raggett describes it as "a consciously medieval European sound [...] like it was recorded in an immense cathedral". The group built a following in Europe, and the album reached No. 2 on the UK indie charts. In 1989, Gerrard and Perry separated domestically – Gerrard moved to Barcelona before returning to Australia and Perry moved to Ireland – but still wrote, recorded and performed as Dead Can Dance.

=== Success ===
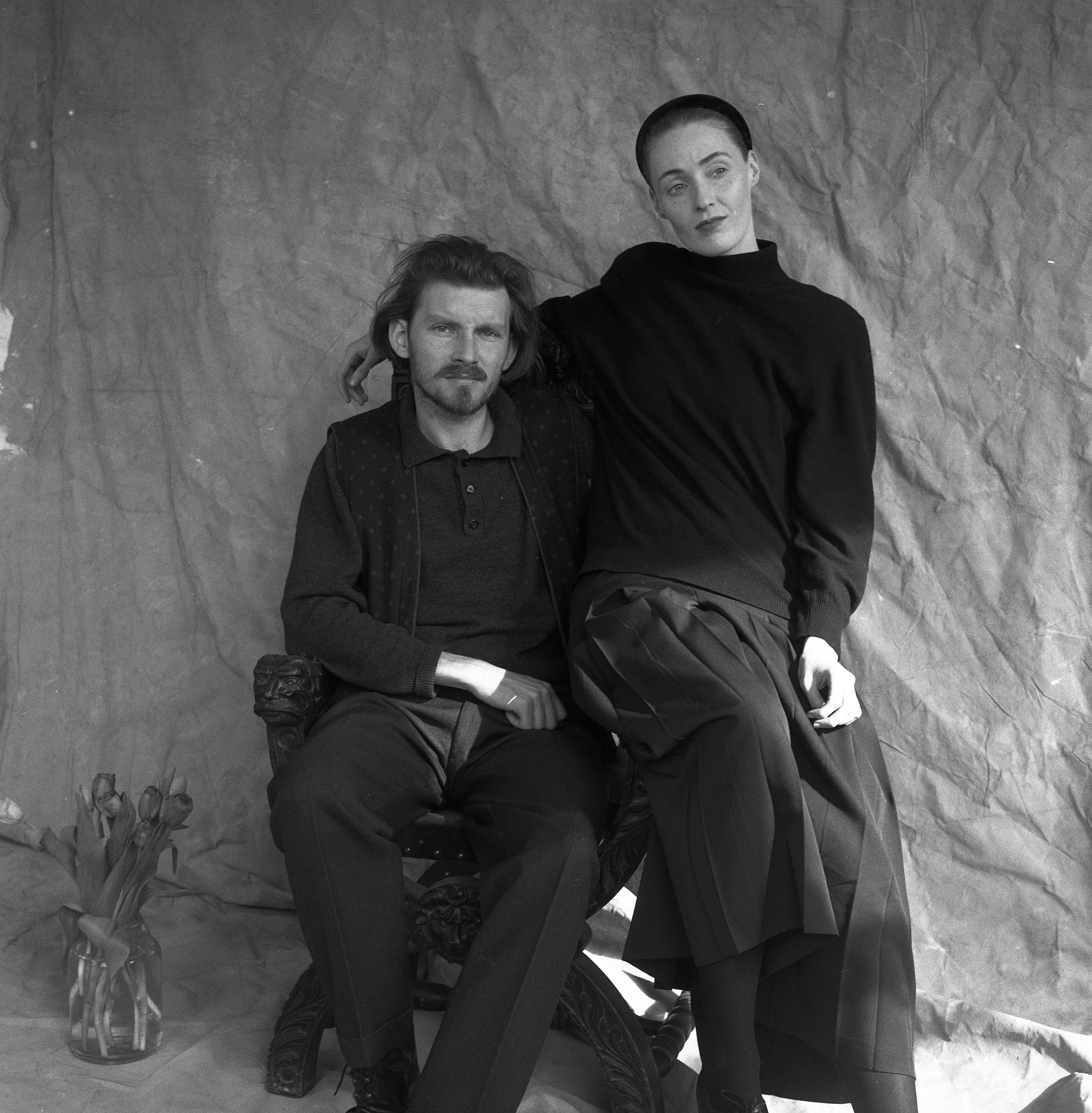
Perry and Gerrard in 1989.

The duo's sixth studio album, Into the Labyrinth, was issued in September 1993 and dispensed with guest musicians entirely; it sold 500,000 copies worldwide and appeared in the Billboard 200. The band became 4AD's highest-selling act. They followed with a world tour in 1994 and recorded a live performance in California which was released as Toward the Within, with video versions on Laserdisc and VHS (later on DVD). Many unofficial bootlegs of concerts spanning its career exist, containing several rare songs that were only performed live. Toward the Within is the duo's first official live album, which reached the Billboard 200 and was followed by In Concert 19 years later. Gerrard released her debut solo recording, The Mirror Pool, and reunited with Perry on the Dead Can Dance studio album Spiritchaser in 1996. The album also charted on Billboard 200 and reached No. 1 on the Top World Music Albums Chart.

=== Disbandment and reunions ===
In 1998, Dead Can Dance began recording a follow-up album to Spiritchaser, which was due to be released in early 1999 followed by a planned world tour. However, they separated before it was completed and canceled the tour. One song from the recording sessions, "The Lotus Eaters", was eventually released on the box set Dead Can Dance (1981–1998) and on the two-disc compilation Wake (2003). Gerrard teamed with Pieter Bourke (Snog, Soma) to issue Duality in April 1998. Perry released Eye of the Hunter in October 1999.

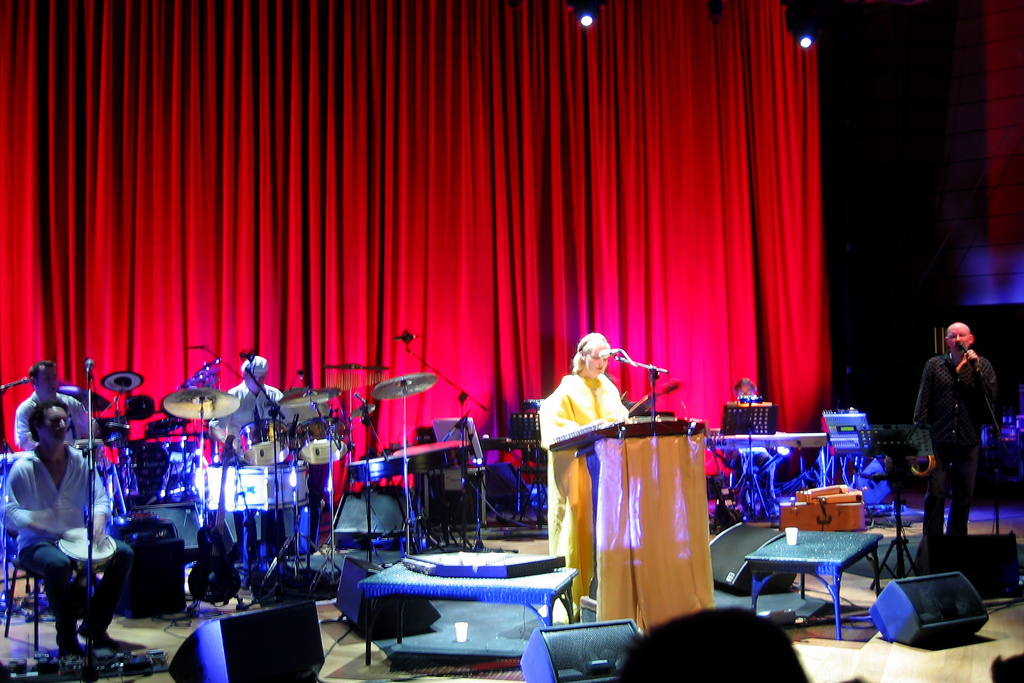
Dead Can Dance, 2005: Gerrard at centre right; Perry at extreme right

Dead Can Dance reunited in 2005 and released limited-edition recordings of thirteen shows from its European tour and eight recordings from the subsequent North American tour, as well as a compilation titled Selections from Europe 2005. These concerts were recorded and released on The Show record label. In 2005, the song "Nierika" became part of the opening titles for Mexican television station TV Azteca's soap opera La Chacala.

On 12 May 2011, Brendan Perry announced on his official web forum that Dead Can Dance would record a new album and then embark on two-month world tour. The band made a formal announcement about its world tour and new album, Anastasis, for a release date of 13 August 2012.

In late 2011, the band announced a reunion world tour, including 12 US cities, to be accompanied by the release of a live album on a new label. The tour was scheduled to begin on 9 August 2012 in Canada and continue until 19 September 2012 in Turkey, 21 and 23 September in Greece, 13 October in Russia, then 28 October 2012 in Ireland, then Mexico and South America and then in Lebanon and finally Australia in February 2013. On 15 November 2012 it was announced that the band would be returning to Europe to continue its tour, starting on 28 May 2013 in Portugal. The final show of the Anastasis World Tour was in Santiago, Chile, on 13 July 2013. On 17 October 2014, the band announced that plans for an upcoming European tour for Spring 2015 had been cancelled "due to unforeseen circumstances".

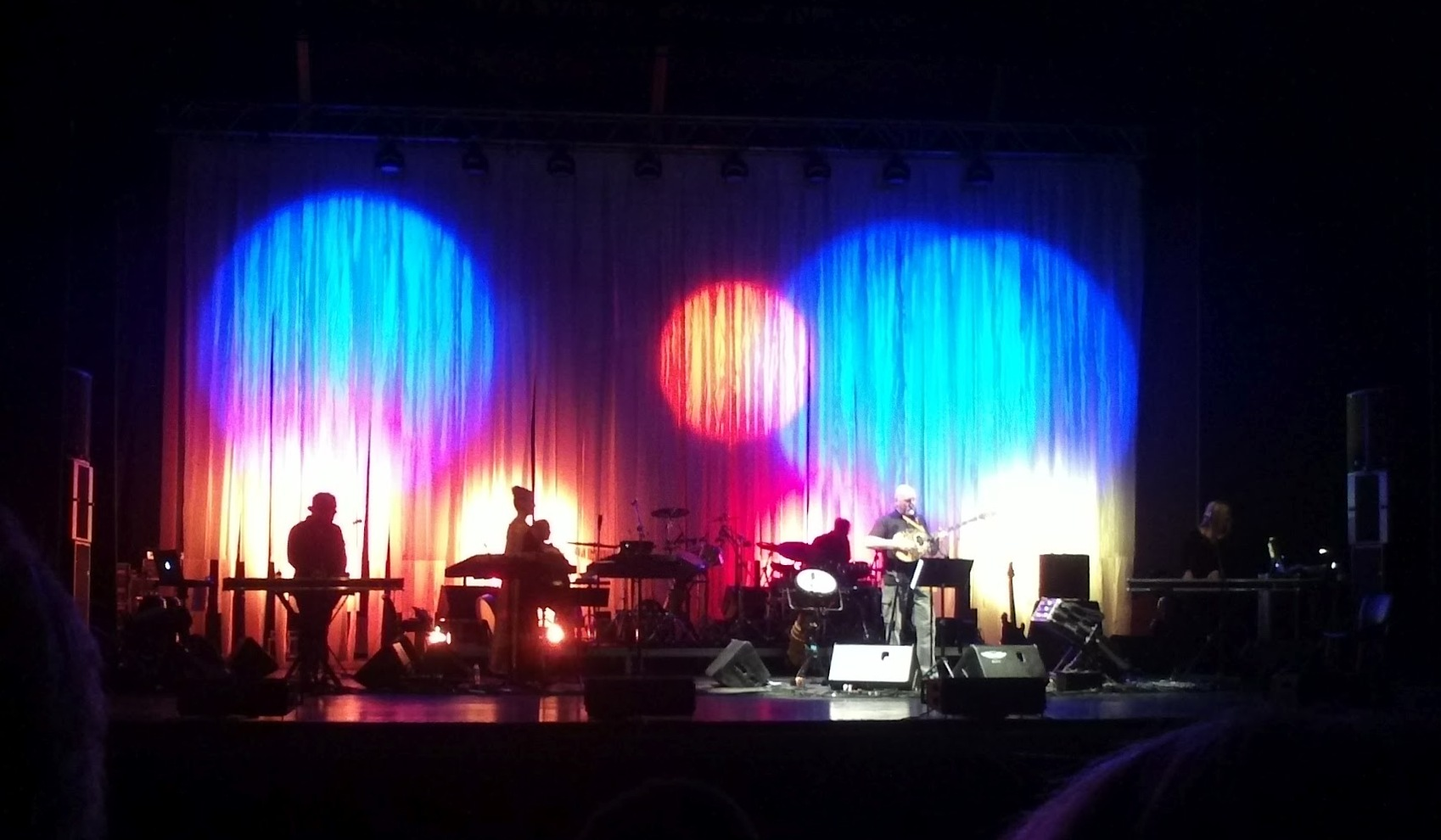
Dead Can Dance at Cemil Topuzlu Open-Air Theatre, Istanbul, 19 September 2012

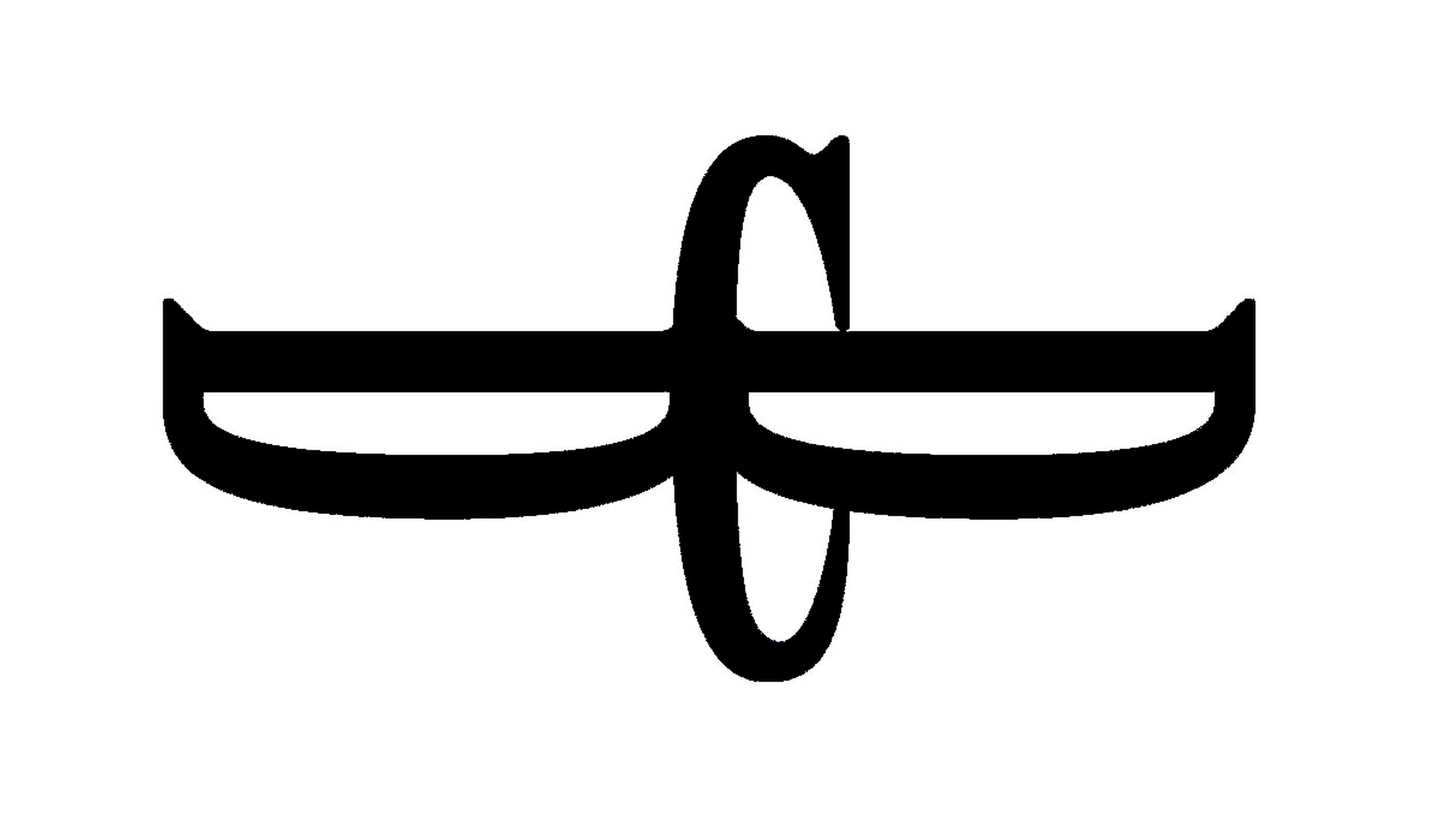
Original text logo formed from the three letters DCD, which is used on the website to date.

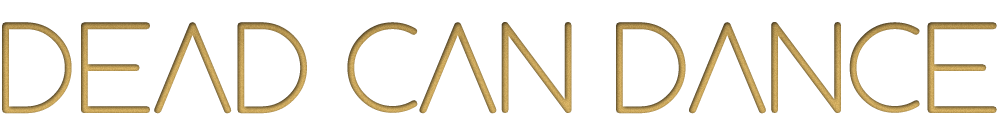
Newer logo, wherein the three "A"s are written without the horizontal line

On 8 September 2015, the band announced the sale of Brendan Perry's Quivvy Church Studio. On 21 April 2018, Perry announced mastering of a new album would be commencing at Abbey Road Studios. The new album, Dionysus, was released on 2 November 2018.

In September 2018, their website announced "A Celebration – Life & Works 1980-2019" tour with dates in Europe in May and June 2019. In contrast to previous tours, the setlist drew heavily from the band's older catalogue, featuring some songs the band had never before played live. In October 2019, the band announced a second leg of the tour with dates in North America, Mexico and South America. However, the tour was postponed to 2021 due to the COVID-19 pandemic. The 2021 tour as well as rescheduled dates for later in the year were also cancelled citing COVID-19. In March 2022, Perry anticipated plans for a new album influenced by Indian music and new arrangements and rehearsals for an upcoming Tour. A 2022 European tour did take place, and a second European leg was scheduled for later in the year as well as a North American leg for 2023. However, in September 2022, the band announced the cancellation of both the second European leg as well as the North American dates, citing unspecified health reasons.

In May 2023, Lisa stated in an interview that she thought Dead Can Dance was "really finished now", citing artistic differences on the making process of Dionysus and the setting of the tracklist from their last tour, as she thought that this situation "started to wean itself away from the kind of connection that we had together". In June 2026, Brendan stated that he and Lisa had "a major argument" after the first leg, and they both hadn't spoken to each other since then. Related to the current status of the band, he revealed that Lisa gave him "her blessing to continue without her". In July 2026, Lisa confirmed that she was not longer involved with the band, but encouraged fans to "celebrate its new incarnation" as Brendan's solo project.

In April 2025, Brendan stated he was working on a sequel to Dionysus, called Apollo, which would be finished by the end of the year. The next month, he announced that Apollo would be a new Dead Can Dance album. However, in July 2026 Brendan stated that he had discarded the idea, due to lack of inspiration. Instead, on March 20, 2026, Dead Can Dance released their first new single in five years, "Our Day Will Come". Dedicated to "the national solidarity between Irish and Palestinian people", half of the proceeds of the single will go to Medical Aid for Palestinians. The band also announced new releases would be sold exclusively on Bandcamp through the band's Holy Tongue Records label. The band cited their discomfort against "streaming platforms that continue to exploit artists and promote AI generated music" as the main reason to sell the band's music via Bandcamp, due to the platform's ban on AI. On April 18, the band released another song, "Death Cults", and on May 15, the song "Mon Amour Sauvage". Those songs, unrelated to Apollo, are part of a series of monthly released singles. Brendan praised this way of recording as "much faster" and "liberating", as he worked "more spontaneously" without contractual obligations.

== Artistry ==
The Australian music historian Ian McFarlane described Dead Can Dance's style as "constructed soundscapes of mesmerising grandeur and solemn beauty; African polyrhythms, Gaelic folk, Gregorian chant, Middle Eastern music, mantras, and art rock." The band's debut album has been labeled gothic, but by 1986's Spleen and Ideal they had turned toward a neoclassical darkwave style that incorporated medieval European music, mythology, romanticism, and religious symbolism. The 1993 album Into the Labyrinth brought ethnic music influences into the foreground.

== Members ==
=== Current members ===
- Brendan Perry – vocals, guitars, bouzouki, saz, oud, electric bass, hurdy-gurdy, drums & percussion, D whistle, tampura, esraj, yayli tambur, tsouras, baglamadaki, keyboards, dulcimer, berimbau (1981–1998, 2005, 2011–present)

=== Former members ===
- Paul Erikson – bass (1981–1983)
- Simon Monroe – drums (1981–1982)
- Lisa Gerrard – vocals, yangqin, percussion (1981–1998, 2005, 2011–2022)
- Peter Ulrich – drums (1982–1985), session percussion (1987, 1996)
- James Pinker – percussion (1983–1985), session timpani (1985)
- Scott Rodger (aka Scott Roger) – bass (1983–1985)

=== Former touring members ===
- Robert Perry – percussion, flute, low D whistle, bagpipes, woodwinds, guitar, berimbau (1987–1998, 2019–2022)
- John Bonnar – keyboards, percussion, vocals (1990–1996, 2005)
- Andrew Claxton – keyboards, percussion (1987, 1993–1994), session bass trombone, tuba (1987)
- Lance Hogan – guitar, bass, percussion (1993–1996, 2005)
- Rónán Ó Snodaigh – percussion, voice (1993–1996)
- Pieter Bourke – keyboards, percussion (1996)
- Nigel Flegg – percussion, drums (1996)
- Paskaal Japhet – percussion (1996)
- Laurence O'Keefe – bass (2005)
- Michael Edwards – keyboards (2005)
- Niall Gregory – percussion, drums (2005)
- Simeon Smith – drums (2005)
- Patrick Cassidy – keyboards (2005)
- Richard Yale – bass, keyboards (2011–2022)
- David Kuckhermann – percussion, hang, tambourine (2012–2019)
- Astrid Williamson – keyboards, backing vocals (2012–2022)
- Jules Maxwell – keyboards (2012–2022)
- Dan Gresson – drums, percussion (2012–2022)

=== Former session musicians ===
- Gus Ferguson – cello (1985, 1987)
- Martin McCarrick – cello (1985)
- Tony Ayres – timpani (1985)
- Richard Avison – trombone (1985, 1987)
- Simon Hogg – trombone (1985)
- Carolyn Costin – violin (1985)
- Andrew Hutton – soprano vocals (1985)
- Ruth Watson – oboe (1987)
- Tony Gamage – cello (1987)
- John Singleton – trombone (1987)
- Mark Gerrard – trumpet (1987)
- Piero Gasparini – viola (1987)
- Alison Harling – violin (1987, 1988)
- Emlyn Singleton – violin (1987)
- Andrew Beesley – viola (1988)
- Sarah Buckley – viola (1988)
- Tony Gamage – cello (1988)
- Rebecca Jackson – violin (1988)
- David Navarro Sust – vocals (1988, 1990)
- Andrew Robinson – bass viol (1990)
- Anne Robinson – bass viol (1990)
- Honor Carmody – tenor viol (1990)
- Lucy Robinson – tenor viol (1990)
- Luis de Góngora – words (1990)
- Renaud Pion – Turkish clarinet (1996)
- Klaus Vormehr – engineering (1996)
- David Kuckhermann – daf, pantam (2012)

== Discography ==
=== Studio albums ===
- Dead Can Dance (1984)
- Spleen and Ideal (1985)
- Within the Realm of a Dying Sun (1987)
- The Serpent's Egg (1988)
- Aion (1990)
- Into the Labyrinth (1993)
- Spiritchaser (1996)
- Anastasis (2012)
- Dionysus (2018)

=== Singles ===
- Our Day Will Come (2026)
- Death Cults (2026)
- Mon Amour Sauvage (2026)

== Sources ==
- *Aston, Martin. Facing the Other Way: The Story of 4AD. The Friday Project, 2013. ISBN 978-0-0074-8961-9
