= 2013 Rialto Channel New Zealand Film Awards =

- Awarded for: Excellence in New Zealand film
- Sponsored by: Rialto Channel
- Date: 10 December 2013
- Location: Shed 10 (upper level), Auckland
- Country: New Zealand
- Presented by: Ant Timpson and Hugh Sundae
- Reward: Moa trophy
- First award: 2013
- Website: http://www.nzfilmawards.co.nz

Television/radio coverage
- Network: Rialto Channel

The 2013 Rialto Channel New Zealand Film Awards is the second presentation for the New Zealand Film Awards, a New Zealand film industry award.

Following the demise of the Aotearoa Film and Television Awards in 2012, New Zealand film industry figure Ant Timpson and nzherald.co.nz online entertainment editor Hugh Sundae announced the formation of the Sorta Unofficial New Zealand Film Awards, also known as the Moas. In 2013 the awards were renamed the New Zealand Film Awards, with the Rialto Channel as the primary sponsor.

The 2013 ceremony took place at Shed 10 (upstairs) in Auckland on 10 December 2013. It was webcast live at the nzherald.co.nz, and broadcast on the Rialto Channel on 15 December.

== Nominees and winners ==
Moas were awarded in 28 categories in four groups – feature film, documentary film, short film and television. The television category has only one award – Best Television Feature or Drama Series – a one-off award created to recognise excellence in television, as there is otherwise no New Zealand television award in 2013.

=== Feature film ===
Rialto Channel Best Film

- Shopping – Mark Albiston and Louis Sutherland
  - The Weight of Elephants – Katja Adomeit and Leanne Saunders
  - Mt Zion – Quinton Hita
  - Mr. Pip – Andrew Adamson, Robin Scholes
  - Fantail – Sarah Cook, Matt Noonan

Flying Fish Best Director

- Shopping – Louis Sutherland and Mark Albiston
  - The Weight of Elephants – Daniel Borgman
  - Mt Zion – Tearepa Kahi
  - Mr. Pip – Andrew Adamson
  - Fantail – Curtis Vowell

Villa Maria Best Actor

- Hugh Laurie – Mr. Pip
  - Demos Murphy – The Weight of Elephants
  - Kevin Paulo – Shopping
  - Stan Walker – Mt Zion
  - Jahalis Ngamotu – Fantail

Villa Maria Best Actress

- Xzannjah – Mr. Pip
  - Whirimako Black – White Lies
  - Angelina Cottrell – The Weight of Elephants
  - Miriama Smith – Mt Zion
  - Sophie Henderson – Fantail

Mili Pictures Best Supporting Actor

- Julian Dennison – Shopping
  - Matthew Sunderland – The Weight of Elephants
  - Temuera Morrison – Mt Zion
  - Eka Darvile – Mr. Pip
  - Stephen Lovatt – Fantail

Mili Pictures Best Supporting Actress

- Laura Peterson – Shopping
  - Antonia Prebble – White Lies –
  - Catherine Wilkin – The Weight of Elephants
  - Healesville Joel – Mr. Pip
  - Amy Usherwood – Eternity

Apex Insurance Best Screenplay

- Mark Albiston and Louis Sutherland – Shopping
  - Dana Rotberg – White Lies –
  - Daniel Borgman – The Weight of Elephants
  - Andrew Adamson – Mr. Pip
  - Sophie Henderson – Fantail

Nikon Best Self-Funded Film

- Crackheads – Tim Tsiklauri and Andy Sophocleous
  - Eternity – Alex Galvin, Noel Galvin, Eric Stark
  - Ghost TV – Phil Davison
  - The Deadly Ponies Gang – Zoe McIntosh
  - The Death and Resurrection Show – Shaun Pettigrew

Niche Cameras Best Cinematography

- Ginny Loane – Shopping
  - Sophia Olsson – The Weight of Elephants
  - John Toon – Mr. Pip
  - Tim Flower – Romeo and Juliet: A Love Song
  - Alun Bollinger – White Lies

Mandy Best Editor

- Molly Marlene Stensgaard – The Weight of Elephants
  - Sim Evan-Jones – Mr. Pip
  - Paul Maxwell – Mt Zion
  - Annie Collins – Shopping
  - Paul Sutorius – White Lies

APRA Best Score

- Harry Gregson-Williams, Tim Finn – Mr. Pip
  - Mahuia Bridgman Cooper – Fantail
  - Shane McLean – Mt Zion
  - Grayson Gilmour – Shopping
  - John Psathas – White Lies

APRA Best Sound

- Dick Reade – Mt Zion
  - Dick Reade – Fantail
  - Mike Hopkins, John McKay, Michael Hedges, Tim Chaproniere and Tony Spear – Fresh Meat
  - Michael Hopkins, Ken Saville, John Mckay, Tim Chaproniere, Pete Smith – Shopping –
  - Steve Finnigan, James Hayday and Chris Sinclair – White Lies

Rodney Wayne Best Costume Design

- Ngila Dickson – Mr. Pip
  - Gavin McLean – Mt Zion
  - Morgan Albrecht – Romeo and Juliet: A Love Song
  - Lucy McLay – Shopping
  - Tracey Collins – White Lies –

MAC Best Makeup Design Hair and Makeup

- Abby Collins, Yolanda Bartram, Vee Gulliver, Andrew Beattie and Main Reactor – White Lies
  - Celeste Strewe – Crackheads
  - Hil Cook, Ange Duncan, Lea Hoare and Natalie Henderson – Fresh Meat
  - Amber D – Giselle

Regional Film Offices NZ Best Production Design

- Tracey Collins – White Lies
  - Grant Major – Mr. Pip
  - Haley Williams – Romeo and Juliet: A Love Song
  - Josh O'Neill – Shopping
  - Kirsty Cameron – The Weight of Elephants

Letterboxd Best Poster Design

- Geoff Francis – Shopping
  - Tony St George – Eternity
  - Connor Kenyon Design – Mr. Pip
  - Asmund Sollihogda – The Weight of Elephants
  - Damon Keen, Jae Frew and Matt Klitscher – White Lies

=== Short film ===
AUT Best Short Film

- Here Be Monsters – dir. Paul Glubb and Nic Gorman; prod. Nadia Maxwell
  - Friday Tigers – Aidee Walker
  - Morepork – Fat Boy Films
  - Tom's Dairy – Oscar Kightley
  - Wide Eyed – Catherine Bisley

Event Cinemas Best Self-Funded Short Film

- Le Taxidermiste – Nick Mayow & Prisca Bouchet
  - Holding The Sun – Dwayne Cameron
  - Morepork – Fat Boy Films
  - Shelved – James Cunningham, Oliver Hilbert and Leon Woud
  - The Sleeping Plot – Ruth Korver

Allpress Best Short Film Actor

- Tony Green – Strongman
  - Leon Wadham – Blankets
  - Simon Wolfgram – Friday Tigers
  - John Sumner – Morepork
  - Mac Kaisuva – Tom's Dairy

Allpress Best Short Film Actress

- Rachel Nicholls – Blind Mice
  - Aidee Walker – Friday Tigers
  - Narelle Ahrens – I'm Going to Mum's
  - Kayte Ferguson – Morepork
  - Nova Waretini-Hewison – The Sleeping Plot

PLS Best Cinematography in a Short Film

- Andrew Stroud – Echoes
  - Roko Babich – Friday Tigers
  - Callan Green – Morepork
  - Grant McKinnon – Tom's Dairy
  - Ryan Alexander Lloyd – Wide Eyed

NZ Herald Online Best Short Film Screenplay

- Campbell Hooper & Joel Kefali – Echoes
  - Aidee Walker – Friday Tigers
  - Lauren Jackson – I'm Going to Mum's
  - Oscar Kightley – Tom's Dairy
  - Catherine Bisley – Wide Eyed

Media Design School Best Technical Contribution to a Short Film

- Frank Rueter, David Duke and Bodo Keller (visual effects) – Blankets
  - Peter Roberts (editing) – Strongman
  - Brighde Riddell (makeup and hair) – The Last Stop
  - Dwayne Cameron (production design) – Holding The Sun
  - Anton Ognyev (visual effects) – Maul

=== Documentary film ===
Telecom Business Hubs Best Documentary

- Gardening with Soul – Vicky Pope and Jess Feast
  - Antarctica: A Year On Ice – Anthony Powell
  - Beyond the Edge – Matthew Metcalfe
  - Finding Mercy – Robyn Patterson, Leanne Pooley
  - He Toki Huna: NZ in Afghanistan – Annie Goldson and Kay Ellmers

Canon Best Documentary Director

- Leanne Pooley – Beyond the Edge
  - Anthony Powell – Antarctica: A Year On Ice
  - Robyn Patterson – Finding Mercy
  - Jess Feast – Gardening with Soul
  - Annie Goldson and Kay Ellmers – He Toki Huna: NZ in Afghanistan

PLS Best Documentary Cinematography

- Anthony Powell – Antarctica: A Year On Ice
  - Richard Bluck – Beyond the Edge
  - Jacob Bryant, Marty Williams – Finding Mercy
  - Ari Wegner, Gareth Moon and Hamish Waterhouse – Gardening with Soul
  - Jake Bryant – He Toki Huna: NZ in Afghanistan

Lotech Best Documentary Editor

- Annie Goldson and James Brown – He Toki Huna: NZ in Afghanistan
  - Simon Price – Antarctica: A Year On Ice
  - Tim Woodhouse – Beyond the Edge
  - Tim Woodhouse – Finding Mercy
  - Annie Collins – Gardening with Soul

=== Television ===
NZ On Air Best Television Feature or Drama Series

- Top of the Lake
  - Harry
  - The Almighty Johnsons
  - The Blue Rose

=== Lifetime Achievement Award ===
- Geoff Murphy
