= Peter van der Fluit =

- Born: October 1963 (age 62–63); Auckland, New Zealand
- Education: University of Auckland
- Occupations: musician, composer, writer, producer, business person
- Years active: 1980–present

Peter van der Fluit (born 1963) is a New Zealand musician, composer, writer, producer, and business person. He was a founding member of the post-punk new wave band the Screaming Meemees. As of 2022 he serves as the main Creative Director at Liquid Studios.

== Screaming Meemees ==
Van der Fluit formed the Screaming Meemees while still in high school at Rosmini College, with classmates Tony Drumm, Michael O'Neill, and Laurence "Yoh" Landwer-Johan. After the inclusion of their single All Dressed Up on compilation album Class of 81 produced by Simon Grigg’s Propeller Records, Grigg signed the band to his label. This was followed by the release of "See Me Go," the first New Zealand single ever to enter the charts at number one. The band released three more top-40 singles and the album If this is Paradise, I'll Take the Bag. The group disbanded in 1983, making its final public performance as the headliners of the 1983 Sweetwaters Music Festival.

== Post-Meemees ==
Van der Fluit returned to school after the break-up of the Screaming Meemees, earning a master's degree in Music from University of Auckland in the late 1980s. Upon completing his degree, van der Fluit moved to London, where he formed the band Magik Roundabout.

Magik Roundabout were an indie pop band formed by Van der fluit with bandmates Scott Duncan and J. Chong, the upbeat debut single 'Everlasting Day...' was released in 1991 on WAU! Mr. Modo Recordings, via M&G Records.

The track was produced by Ben Watkins and Martin 'Youth' Glover and mixed by Marius De Vries and Steve Sidelnyk. As they geared up to issue a second 45, 'All Broken Down', the owners of a certain French stop-motion animation show apparently took exception to the band's name, which caused some set-backs. Re-branding as simply Magik, the trio bounced back in 1993 with two further singles, 'Don't Look Now' and 'Voice Of A Generation', which saw them take on a more traditional guitar-based indie sound. An album sampler surfaced, but said album did not.

Later In 1993, Van der Fluit returned to Auckland. In 1998 with former Meemees bandmate O'Neill, he founded Liquid Studios, which composes original music for the advertising, film, and television industries. Among other achievements, Liquid Studios has won over twenty AXIS awards from the Communication Agencies Association of New Zealand, including the 2010 "Production Company of the Year” award. Liquid Studios was the first audio company to earn that award. As of 2022 he serves as the main Creative Director at Liquid Studios.

Van der Fluit and O'Neill also composed Romeo and Juliet – The Rock Opera, which premiered in June 2010 at ArtsEd in London. As part of the production arrangement, a small percentage of all future gross earnings from the musical will go to ArtsEd to fund its scholastic activities. The partners have since adapted Romeo and Juliet – The Rock Opera into a feature film titled Romeo and Juliet: A Love Song, funded by the New Zealand Film Commission. Van der Fluit and O'Neill are also near completion of a second musical-rock opera, about the assassination of Martin Luther King Jr.

In 2018 Van der Fluit scored the soundtrack for the Netflix show The New Legends of Monkey It is an ongoing series which currently has two seasons, the last one airing in 2020. Van der Fluit was nominated for a 2018 New Zealand Television award for his work on this series.

In 2018 Van der Fluit also scored the short film I Will Not Write Unless I Am Swaddled in Furs, for his work on this he was nominated for the best original score in the Indie Short Fest and Southern Shorts Awards and won Best original score awards in the Independent Shorts Awards and McMinnville Short Film Festival.
