= Terrorways =

New Zealand punk rock band from Auckland

The Terrorways
- Origin: Auckland, New Zealand
- Years active: Late 1970s
- Label: Ripper Records
- Past members: Kerry Buchanan; Gary Hunt; John ‘No-one’ Hunter; Dean Martelli; Pete Mesmer; Chris Orange

Terrorways, not to be confused with Punk bands The Tearaways from Melbourne, Victoria, Australia, or from Hertfordshire, England, were a New Zealand punk rock band from Auckland, who were big on the local punk scene. They are also remembered for their songs "She's a Mod" and "Never Been to Borstal".

== Background ==
The group which played at the Zwines club was a favourite of Boot Boys in Auckland. At the end of 1978, drummer Kerry Buchanan was replaced by Gary Hunt who had come from Gary Havoc & The Hurricanes. The original band called it a day and their final performance was on 1 December 1979. In 1980, the group got together to play a gig at the XS Café.

The group appears on the Ripper Records AK79 compilation.

== Later years ==
Kerry Buchanan would become a journalist and write for Real Groove magazine. In 2014, Buchanan presented the 2014 'Independent Music NZ Classic Record' award to Ripper Records head Bryan Staff for the New Zealand punk album AK.79. Thirty years later, the group was part of a show at The Monte Cristo Room, Nelson Street, Auckland that included other Punk acts such as Proud Scum, The Spelling Mistakes, X-Features, and the Scavengers.

== Background on members ==
=== Kerry Buchanan ===
In later years, Buchanan became a commentator, writer and working for a Hi-Fi store in Auckland. One of the things Buchanan has commented on was in an essay of his about talented Maori acts that were not given their due in their status, and being referred by Caucasian commentators as just cabaret acts.

=== Gary Hunt ===
Hunt may have been with a punk group either prior to or after his time with Gary Havoc & the Hurricanes. In 1986, 1987, he played with Gregg McKenzie in The McKenzie and his work appears on a collection of live recordings that include "I Don't Dream Anymore" and "da'Phunk ' 87". In 2015, he was playing in New Zealand in a group called led by former Pop Mechanix and Coconut Rough frontman Andrew Snoid, called Andrew McLennan & The Underminers. Hunt would later work with Hamish Kilgour. They worked together and released the Hollie Fullbrook / Tiny Ruins Hurtling Through EP. Another group Hunt had been playing in some time in the 2010s was The Wonderfish Collective, a 15-piece group.

=== Members list ===
- Kerry Buchanan aka Eddie Clanger - drums
- Gary Hunt - drums
- John ‘No-one’ Hunter - vocals
- Dean Martelli - guitar
- Pete Mesmer - guitar
- Chris Orange - bass

== Discography ==
=== Singles ===
7" Singles
Artist	Title	Release info	Year	"	Notes
The Terrorways / Proud Scum	"Short Haired Rock And Roll" / "Suicide 2"	Ripper RIP 1	1980	7"	

=== Albums ===
Appearances
Title	Track(s)	Release info	Year	Format	Notes
AK•79	"Never Been To Borstal", "She's A Mod"	Ripper Records RPR 1	1976	Vinyl LP	
Get A Haircut 31 Of The Best New Zealand Rock'n'Rollers Ever!	"Short Haired Rock'n'Roll"	Zerox DZEROX 09	2004	CD	
Kiwi By Death NZ Punk Rarities 1977-83	"Never Been To Borstal"	Second Chance Records SCARE1	2010	CD	
