= Brendan Perry =

British singer and multi-instrumentalist (born 1959)

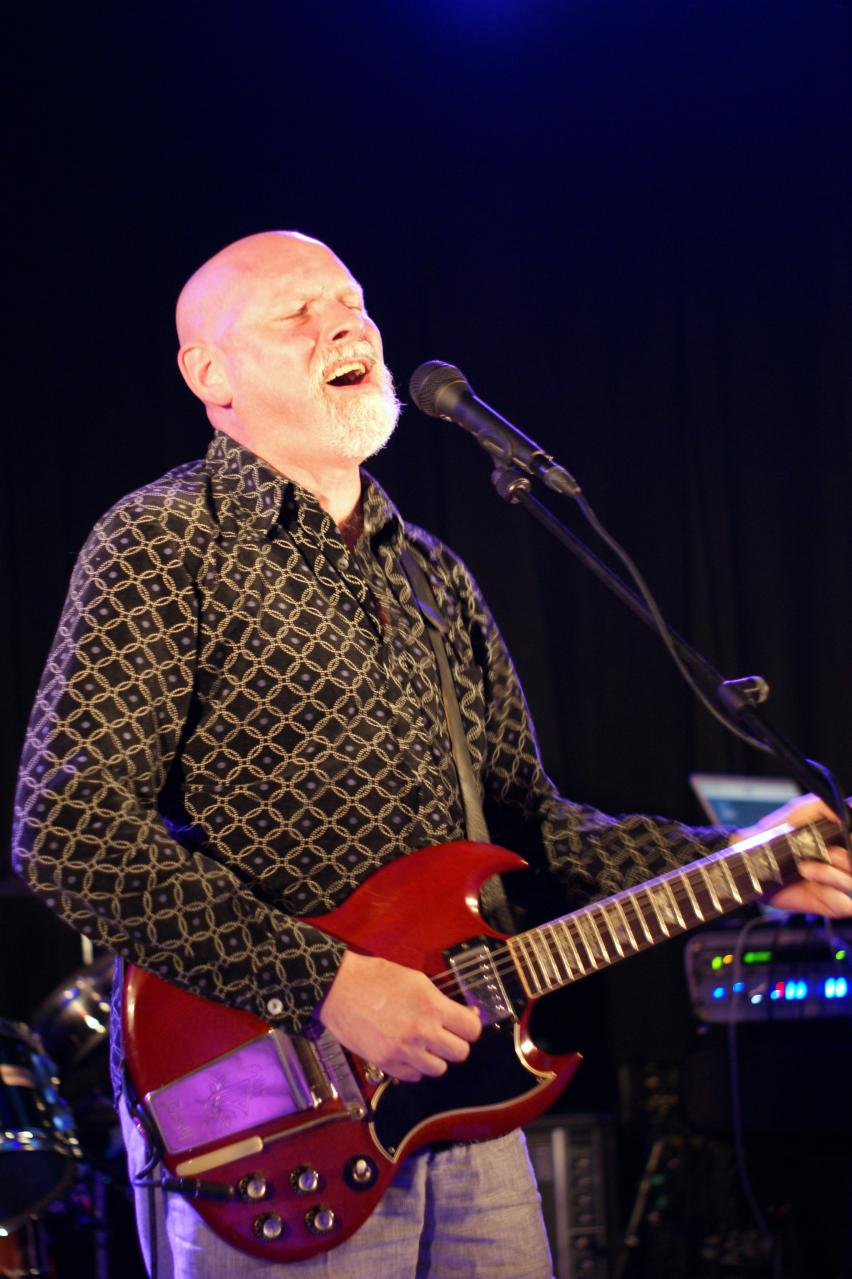
- Brendan Perry on stage in 2010

Background information
- Born: Brendan Michael Perry; 30 June 1959 (age 67); Whitechapel, London, England
- Occupations: Musician, songwriter, producer
- Instruments: Vocals, guitar, bass guitar, keyboards, hurdy-gurdy, percussion, bouzouki, mandolin, low whistle, hammered dulcimer
- Website: brendanperry.com

Brendan Michael Perry (born 30 June 1959) is an English singer and multi-instrumentalist best known for his work as half of the duo Dead Can Dance with Lisa Gerrard.

== Early life ==
Perry was born in Whitechapel, London, England, in 1959 to a mother from Cavan, Ireland, and a father from London. He was raised and schooled in the East End of London until his family moved to Auckland, New Zealand, in 1973. Having received no formal musical education, Perry began to play the guitar at St Paul's College, the Catholic school he attended in Ponsonby. After failing to become a primary school teacher and join the civil service, Perry worked at a series of jobs until joining the Scavengers in 1977. At first Perry played bass guitar, later taking on the duties of lead vocalist when the original singer left the band. Apart from a handful of original songs, the band covered music from the Stooges, New York Dolls, and late-1960s psychedelia. After two years, having failed to secure a recording deal or live dates, the band moved to Melbourne, Australia, in November 1978 and changed its name to Marching Girls. In 1980, Perry left the Marching Girls to pursue a solo career, experimenting with tape loops, synthesis, and alternative forms of rhythm. In 1981, Perry formed Dead Can Dance with Simon Monroe and Paul Erikson (both of whom were to leave soon after they had relocated to London), and Lisa Gerrard.

== Career ==
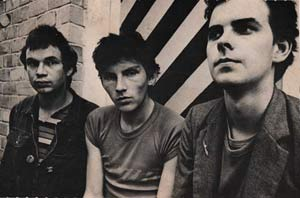
The Scavengers – Perry (centre), Ken Cooke (left), Simon Monroe (right)

=== The Scavengers and Marching Girls ===
Though now primarily known for his work with Dead Can Dance, Perry's first musical forays were in a markedly different style. In 1977, Perry was a leading member of the New Zealand punk rock band the Scavengers, working under the pseudonym of Ronnie Recent. Perry started as the band's bass player, becoming lead vocalist after a lineup change in 1978. In 1979, the band moved to Melbourne and changed its name to the Marching Girls. Perry left the band in 1980. Perry's work with these two bands can be found on the 1979 compilation album AK79 that was re-released on CD in 1994 and on vinyl in 2020. The Scavengers released two collections of their tracks in New Zealand, in 2003 and 2014. The Scavengers are regarded as New Zealand's equivalent of the Buzzcocks, with the Perry co-penned song "Mysterex" regarded as one of the country's best and most distinctive punk-rock recordings. Marching Girls also reached the New Zealand singles charts in 1980 with "True Love."

=== Dead Can Dance ===
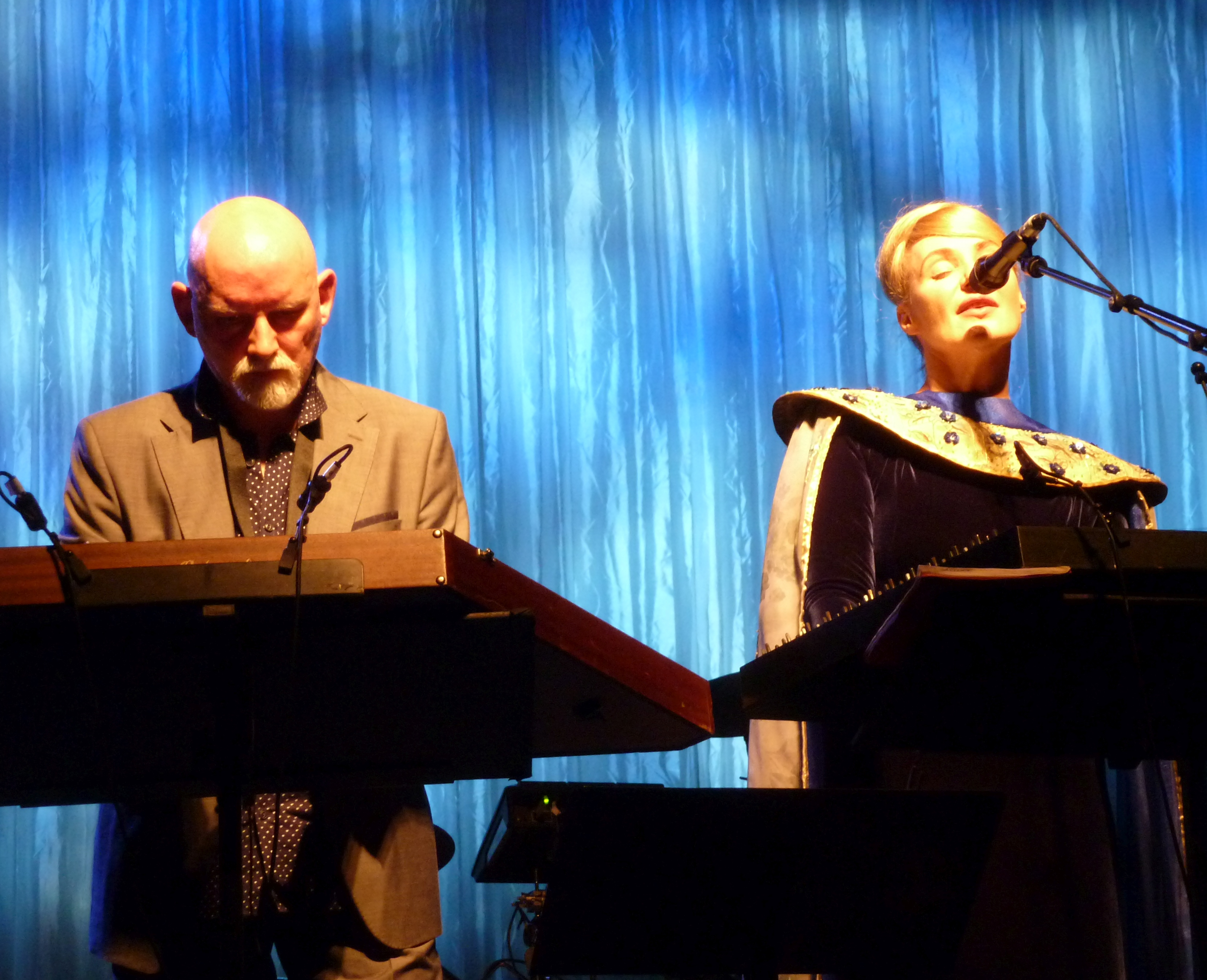
Perry and Lisa Gerrard during a concert of Dead Can Dance in Paris, June 2013

Dead Can Dance were originally formed as a trio in 1981 in Melbourne, by Perry together with drummer Simon Monroe and bass player Paul Erikson. They later became a quartet with the addition of Lisa Gerrard on vocals and percussion. In 1982, Dead Can Dance moved to London leaving Simon Monroe in Australia. Peter Ulrich played drums in the band's first demos, concerts and recordings. Paul Erikson soon left the band to fly back to Australia, leaving the band a duo. The band went on to record eight albums on the 4AD Records record label beginning with the self-titled Dead Can Dance album, which was released in February 1984.

In the early 1990s, Perry relocated to his mother's home county of Cavan, Ireland, converting an old lakeside church at Quivvy into a recording studio. The church was sold in 2019 to Irish singer-songwriter, Don Mescall.

=== Solo career ===
In 1999, Perry released his solo album Eye of the Hunter on 4AD Records. The album contained songs written by Perry and a cover of Tim Buckley's song "I Must Have Been Blind." Perry would eventually cover more Tim Buckley songs: "Happy Time", "Chase the Blues Away", "Dream Letter" and "Song to the Siren".

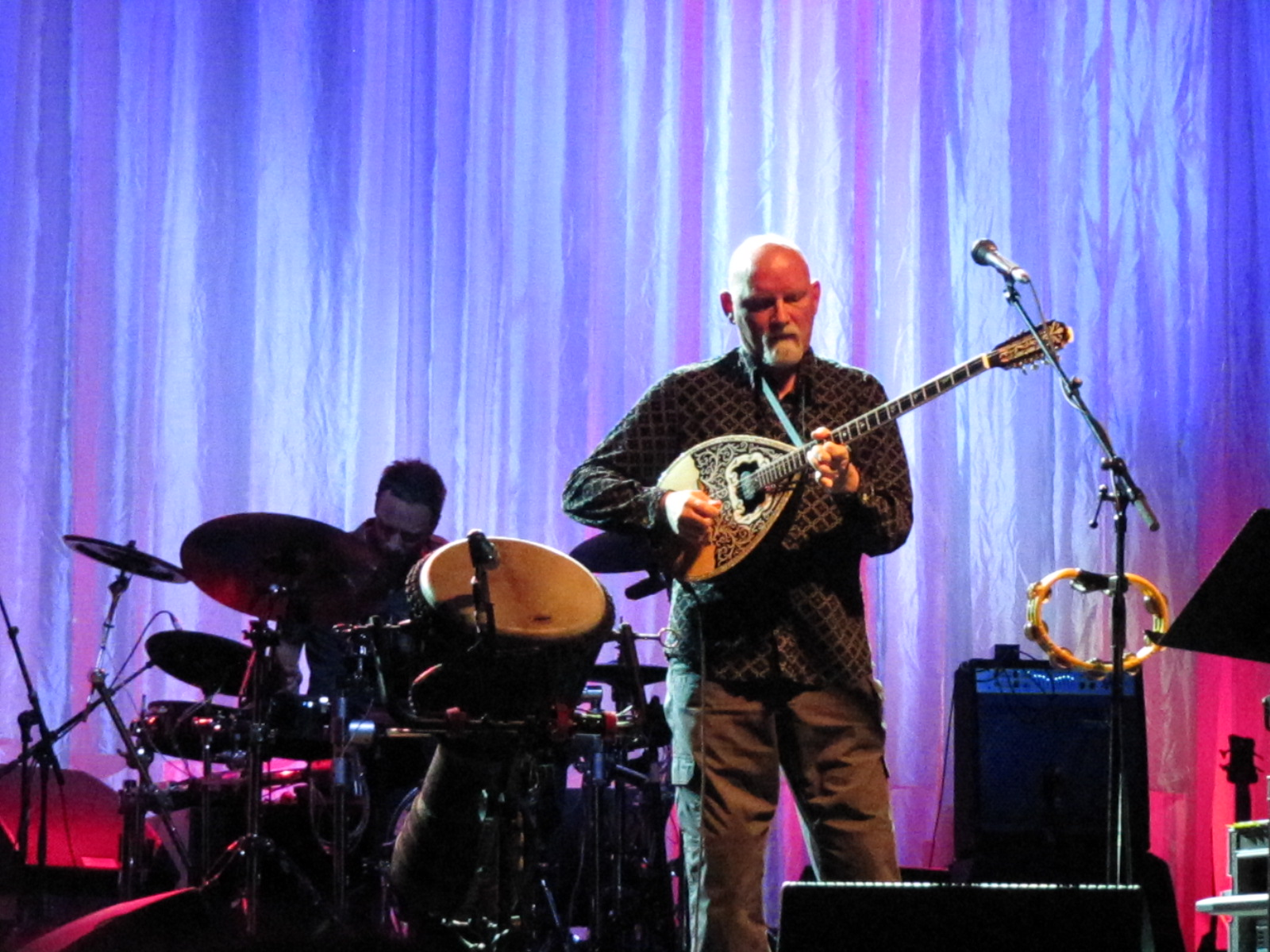
Perry in 2013

Around 2001, Perry made the music for a 10-minute film (Mushin) made by Graham Wood, who designed the artwork of the box set Dead Can Dance (1981-1998) and the album Wake.

Perry announced his departure from 4AD in September 2008, and promised a new album titled Ark in early 2009. According to a reply Perry made to a comment on his Myspace blog, the new album would be very different from Eye of the Hunter, notably because it would feature rhythm machines and electric guitars. "Utopia", a demo version of a song from the album, was made available on his Myspace blog. Ark was eventually released on 7 June 2010.

In March 2016 it was announced that he would collaborate with French musician Olivier Mellano and the Breton traditional band Bagad Cesson on a project titled No Land.

== Discography ==
=== Solo albums ===
- Eye of the Hunter (1999)
- Ark (2010)
- Songs of Disenchantment: Music from the Greek Underground (2020)

=== Compilations ===
- The Scavengers: The Scavengers (2003) [Compilation LP of demos and assorted tracks from Brendan Perry's punk band]
- AK79 (1980) [New Zealand punk collection including The Scavengers, reissued in 1994 and 2020 with the Marching Girls]
- London ICA (13 Year Itch Festival) (2008) [Solo, only available as a MP3/MP4 download]

=== Contributions ===
- Opera Multi Steel: Stella obscura (CD, "Du chant des elfes")
- The 13 Year Itch (4AD compilation, "Happy time" 1993)
- Elijah's Mantle: Angels of perversity (1993, "Paradis IAC" & "Quem di dilicunt -part two")
- Hector Zazou: Sahara Blue (1994, "Youth" & "Black Stream" [w/Lisa Gerrard])
- Hector Zazou: Songs from the cold seas (1994, "Annuka suaren neito" & "Adventures in the Scandinavian skin trade")
- Rare on Air (KCRW compilation, "The Captive Heart" 1994)
- CoEx: Synaesthesia (1995, "Chant of Amergin")
- Hector Zazou & Harold Budd: Glyph (1995, "Around the corner from everywhere")
- Hector Zazou: Lights in the dark ("Gol na dtrí Muire", "In ainm an athar le bua" & "Caoine Mhuire")
- Barbara Gogan & Hector Zazou: Made on Earth (1997, "True love")
- Sunset Heights 1997 (movie soundtrack by Perry)
- Greenwood voice of the celtic myth (compilation, "Balor's song", 1997)
- Peter Ulrich: Pathways and Dawns (programming & sequencing, guitars, hurdy-gurdy & tin whistles)
- Sing a Song for You: Tribute to Tim Buckley (tribute album, "Dream letter", 2000)
- Zoar: Clouds without water (2003, "Winter wind" & "Wakeworld")
- Piano Magic: Ovations (2009, "The Nightmare Goes On" & "You Never Loved This City")
- Olivier Mellano: No Land (2017)
- Deleyaman: The lover, The stars & The citadel (2016, "Escape" & "Autumn Sun")
- Deleyaman: Sentinel (2020, "The Valley")
