= Ceremony (Tiny Ruins album) =

2023 album by Tiny Ruins

Studio album by Tiny Ruins
- Released: 28 April 2023
- Genres: Folk; pop
- Length: 40:18
- Labels: Ursa Minor; Milk!; Marathon Artists; Ba Da Bing
- Producer: Tom Healy

Tiny Ruins chronology
Olympic Girls (2019)	Ceremony (2023)

Singles from Ceremony
- 1. "The Crab / Waterbaby" Released: 18 January 2023; 2. "Dorothy Bay" Released: 17 February 2023; 3. "Dogs Dreaming" Released: 9 March 2023; 4. "Out of Phase" Released: 25 April 2023

Ceremony is the fourth studio album by New Zealand indie folk band Tiny Ruins. Inspired by the Manukau Harbour and life events of vocalist and songwriter Hollie Fullbrook, including a miscarriage, the album was recorded in 2021 by the band, and released in April 2023, after the birth of Fulbrook's first child.

== Production ==
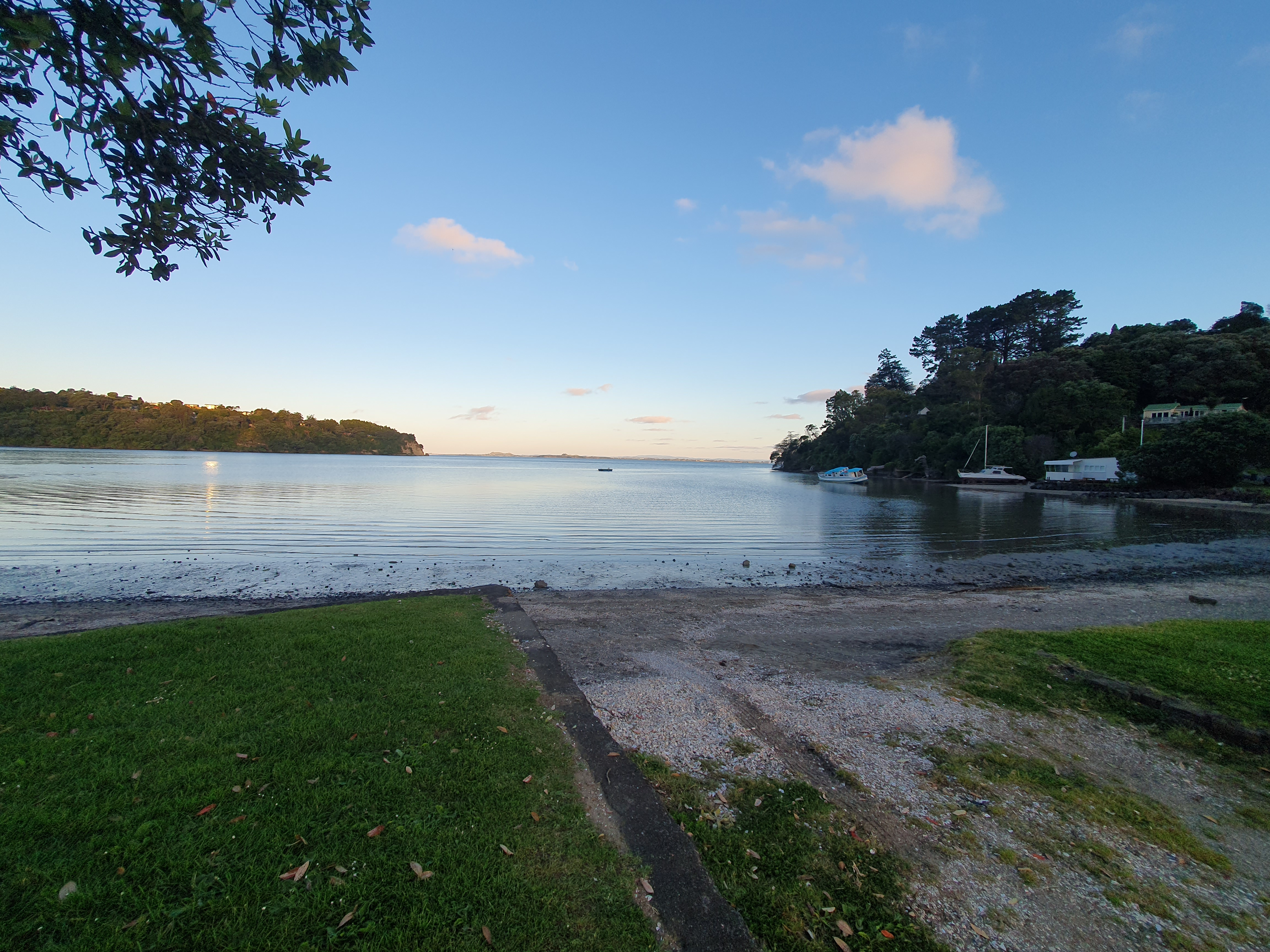
Much of the album was inspired by Fullbrook's walks along the rocky shores of the Little Muddy Creek and the Manukau Harbour near Laingholm in West Auckland

In 2018, the band's vocalist and songwriter Hollie Fullbrook and her partner moved to South Titirangi during the final recording and mixing sessions for the band's album Olympic Girls. Fullbrook experienced a miscarriage at 19 weeks into her pregnancy, and began writing poems as coping mechanisms during the recording sessions. Fullbrook's emotions changed from numbness and grief into anger, leading her to part ways with her previous record labels, and feeling the need to transform her loss into something meaningful. Fullbrook and Tiny Ruins toured Olympic Girls for eighteen months, returning to New Zealand in early 2020 amidst the COVID-19 pandemic.

During the COVID-19 lockdowns in New Zealand, Fullbrook felt more time and space to process her emotions. She married her partner, adopted two dogs, and reconnected with her environment, especially the Little Muddy Creek and the Manukau Harbour, near her home. Fullbrook revisited the poems she had written during her miscarriage, and in mid-2020 wrote much of the album at a wellness retreat in Raglan, where she stayed alone in a disused train carriage.

Fullbrook felt that the songs written for Ceremony were the most personal she had ever written, inspired by introspection, solitude and quietness. While writing the songs, Fullbrook grappled with the decision to try again for a baby, and what a baby might change in her life, after coming to a point in her life where she felt satisfied. All of the song on the album are set around the Manukau Harbour, taking inspiration from the idea of tides and forces of nature. "Dogs Dreaming" was inspired by Fullbrook visiting the Manukau Heads Lighthouse on the Āwhitu Peninsula at dusk. "The Crab / Waterbaby" was inspired by a walk along Little Muddy Creek, when Fullbrook came across an upturned crab. "Dorothy Bay" was inspired by walks with her dogs at Dorothy Bay near her home in Laingholm, and the feeling of being pulled by her two young dogs.

Tiny Ruins came together as a band in 2021 to work on the album. Ceremony was primarily recorded at Paquin Studios in Auckland, where the band had recorded their previous albums. "Earthly Things" and "Sounds Like" had additional recording sessions at Roundhead Studios in Auckland, while "Dear Annie" was also recorded at band-member Alex Freer's personal studio. Fullbrook felt self-doubt around grief being the basis of an album, and felt anxious when she brought the songs to the band to record. Her bandmates were accepting, and through the recording process, Fullbrook felt more comfortable with the songs; many evolving into new directions. The recording sessions for Ceremony were mostly finished by late 2021, and the band decided to delay the release of the album, to allow Fullbrook and her partner to have a baby.

The album's cover art was painted by New Zealand artist Christiane Shortal.

== Release and promotion ==
The first single released from the album was "The Crab / Waterbaby" in January 2023, The album was formally announced in February, paired with the release of the album's second single "Dorothy Bay", which was promoted with a music video filmed on the Āwhitu Peninsula. The band performed at the Hamilton Arts Festival on 25 February and the Off Centre Festival in Christchurch on 4 March.

The album's third single "Dogs Dreaming" was released in early March, which the band performed in a live session video in early April. "Out of Phase" was released three days before the album, on 25 April.

Tiny Ruins performed an eight-date release tour of the album in May across New Zealand, culminating with a performance at the Hollywood Avondale in Auckland on 27 May.

== Critical reception ==
Professional ratings
Aggregate scores
Source	Rating
AnyDecentMusic?	7.5/10
Metacritic	83/100
Review scores
Source	Rating
AllMusic	4/5 stars
Clash	8/10
The Guardian	4/5 stars
Sputnik Music	4.2/5 stars
The 13th Floor	4/5 stars

Ceremony was well-received by music critics upon release. On Metacritic, which assigns a normalised rating out of 100 based on reviews from several publications, Ceremony received an average score of 83, based on six critics, indicating "universal acclaim". Marty Duda of the 13th Floor gave the album four out of five stars, describing Ceremony as "cozy, comfortable and uncluttered", and believing that Tiny Ruins had created a classic album. Tony Stamp of Radio New Zealand felt that the band members of Tiny Ruins were a crucial part of Ceremony, with them acting "as a support system for Fullbrook – staying out of her way during vocal flights, and filling the gaps with sound when it's needed".

== Commercial reception ==
The album debuted at number nine in New Zealand.

== Track listing ==
All tracks are written by Hollie Fullbrook.

Ceremony track listing
No.	Title	Length
1.	"Dogs Dreaming"	4:21
2.	"Daylight Savings"	3:52
3.	"Diving & Soaring"	3:30
4.	"In Light of Everything"	3:03
5.	"Out of Phase"	3:34
6.	"Dorothy Bay"	4:53
7.	"Seafoam Green"	3:13
8.	"Earthly Things"	3:21
9.	"Dear Annie"	2:31
10.	"Sounds Like"	4:14
11.	"The Crab / Waterbaby"	3:52
Total length:		40:18

== Credits and personnel ==
- Cass Basil – bass guitars, upright bass, backing vocals, fife
- Alex Corbett – engineer (8, 10)
- Alex Freer – engineer (9), drums, percussion
- Hollie Fullbrook – songwriting, vocals, acoustic & electric guitars
- Tom Healy – engineer, electric guitars, twelve-string guitar, mellotron, hammond B3 organ, piano, Oberheim Xpander, Minimoog, Fender Rhodes, backing vocals, mixing, producer
- Emily Wheatcroft-Snape – engineer (8, 10)
- Christian Wright – mastering

== Charts ==
Weekly chart performance for Ceremony
Chart (2023)	Peak position
New Zealand Albums (RMNZ)	9
