= See Me Go =

Single by Screaming Meemees
- B-side: "Till I Die"
- Released: July 1981
- Recorded: Harlequin Studios, May/June 1981
- Genre: Ska, post-punk
- Length: 3:30
- Label: Propeller Records
- Songwriter(s): Michael O'Neill, Tony Drumm
- Producer(s): Andrew Snoid

Screaming Meemees singles chronology
"Can’t Take It" (1981)	"See Me Go" (1981)	"Sunday Boys" (1981)

"See Me Go" is a 1981 single by New Zealand post-punk band the Screaming Meemees. It is notable for being the first New Zealand song to debut at number one in the New Zealand singles chart.

== Background ==
After signing to Propeller records, the band recorded live favourite "See Me Go" at Harlequin Studios in Auckland. The song was written by band members Michael O'Neill and Tony Drumm. A demo version had previously charted on Auckland student radio station Radio B.

Several versions of the song were recorded using different producers. A limited-edition, individually numbered 12" single limited to 500 copies was released, including two versions of "See Me Go", "Till I Die" and a live recording of "Poison Boys". There was also a 7" version with "See Me Go" and "Till I Die" with 4000 copies and available only for one week. The song was called "Seemeego-o" on the single cover art.

Delays in the pressing of the single caused demand beyond the 500 available copies, so distribution was rationed to retailers. The 7" sold out within 24 hours and the single entered the chart at number one, which it achieved without any commercial radio airplay. The single was immediately deleted the day of release, ensuring no further copies would be available. The band chose not to immediately capitalise on the success of the single, choosing not to tour or release a quick live album. Instead they worked on their debut album If This Is Paradise, I'll Take The Bag, which was released in 1982.

== Music video ==
After the single's sudden chart success, the band were given the opportunity to make a video with Television New Zealand at Avalon Studios in Wellington. The video was directed by Simon Morris and was more sophisticated than the typical music videos produced at TVNZ in the early 1980s.

== Track listings ==
12"

1. "See Me Go" — 3:30
2. "Poison Boys" (Live) — 2:57
3. "Till I Die" — 2:22
4. "See Me Go — 3:26

7"

1. "See Me Go" — 3:30
2. "Till I Die" — 2:22

== Charts ==
"See Me Go" was the first New Zealand song to debut at number one in the New Zealand singles chart. It would be 18 years before the next number-one debut single from a New Zealand artist, "Tonight" by TrueBliss in 1999, following its appearance in the first Popstars television series.

Chart (1981)	Peak position
New Zealand (Recorded Music NZ)	1
