= Eye of the Hunter =

Studio album by Brendan Perry
- Released: 4 October 1999 (UK)
- Recorded: Quivvy Church, Ireland
- Genre: Folk rock, dream pop
- Length: 42:10
- Label: 4AD (CAD 9015)
- Producer: Brendan Perry

Brendan Perry chronology
Eye of the Hunter (1999)	Ark (2010)

Eye of the Hunter is the debut solo album by Brendan Perry, previously the male half of the band Dead Can Dance. The album was released by 4AD on 4 October 1999 in the UK and a day later in the US.

== Overview ==
The album's title is found in the lyrics of the album's first single "Voyage of Bran", wherein a character called Brendan says: "I live by the river where the old gods still dream of inner communion with the open sea / Through the eye of a hunter in search of a prey, neither beast nor human in my philosophy."

The song "Sloth" first appeared during concerts with Dead Can Dance and appears on the band's 2001 box set Dead Can Dance (1981–1998). "I Must Have Been Blind" is a cover of a Tim Buckley song, from his 1970 album Blue Afternoon. Perry later covered another song by Buckley, "Dream Letter," which was released the following year on the tribute album Sing a Song for You.

== Reception ==
Professional ratings
Review scores
Source	Rating
AllMusic	4.5/5 stars
EW.com	(positive)

Critical reception to the album was generally positive.

== Track listing ==
All tracks are written by Brendan Perry (except where noted)

No.	Title	Length
1.	"Saturday's Child"	4:30
2.	"Voyage of Bran"	5:33
3.	"Medusa"	6:10
4.	"Sloth"	3:32
5.	"I Must Have Been Blind" (Tim Buckley)	5:07
6.	"The Captive Heart"	4:00
7.	"Death Will Be My Bride"	5:46
8.	"Archangel"	7:35
Total length:		42:10

Note: The title "Voyage of Bran" refers to Irish story The Voyage of Bran, and "Medusa" to the mythological Medusa.

== Personnel ==
Musical

- Brendan Perry – vocals, 12-string guitar, electric guitar, mandolin, keyboards

with

- Glen Garrett – electric bass guitar, upright bass guitar
- Liam Bradley – drums
- Martin Quinn – pedal steel guitar
- Michael Brunnock – backing vocals on "Saturday's Child"

Technical

- Mastered by Walter Coelho at Masterpiece

Graphical

- Art direction by Brendan Perry
- Design by Chris Bigg
- Back cover photograph by Dennis Di Cicco
- Textures by v23 (Vaughan Oliver)
