= Romeo and Juliet: A Love Song =

- Directed by: Tim van Dammen
- Written by: Michael O'Neill; Peter van der Fluit; Tim van Dammen
- Produced by: Alastair Carruthers; Michael O'Neill; Peter van der Fluit; Tim van Dammen
- Starring: Derya Parlak; Christopher Landon
- Cinematography: Tim Flower
- Edited by: Jonno Woodford-Robinson
- Music by: Michael O'Neill; Peter van der Fluit
- Release date: July 26, 2013
- Running time: 97 min
- Country: New Zealand
- Language: English

Romeo and Juliet: A Love Song is a 2013 New Zealand film created by Michael O'Neill and Peter van der Fluit and directed by Tim van Dammen. Set in a New Zealand trailer park, it is a rock opera version of Romeo and Juliet where the actors lip synch to recordings of tracks from many different musical styles. O'Neill and Van Der Fluit turned Shakespeare's text into a series of tunes which they brought to van Dammen. He helped turn them into a film with a cast that was mostly "models and interesting looking faces". It stars models Christopher Landon and Derya Parlak as the titular characters and was filmed in 2011 at a Waipu Cove trailer park community.

== Cast ==
- Dallas Barnett as Montegue
- Sarah Houbolt as Friar Lawrence
- Christopher Landon as Romeo
- Ricky McLennan as Mercutio
- Derya Parlak as Juliet
- Cameron Rhodes as The Prince
- Johnny Sol as Lord Capulet
- Anton Tennet as Benvolio
- Sarah Valentine as Princes Wife
- Dan Veint as Tybalt
- Isaac Westenra as Sampson

== Reception ==
The New Zealand Herald's Francesca Rudkin writes"Romeo and Juliet: A Love Song isn't without some wobbles, and some tracks aren't as lyrically clear and catchy as others, but the ambition of this project should be admired." She calls it "a brave piece of film-making for those who appreciate the storytelling magic of music and can't resist the theatrics of a musical." Sunday News says "essentially it's a one-joke film that, by the third act, has well and truly made its point. Purists might complain that the light-hearted treatment trashes the text but for the most part it's fun and proves that Shakespeare's story really is timeless." In the Press James Croot gave it 3 stars and states "although sometimes a truly jarring mix (the a cappella moments are especially grating), which actually serves to lessen the story's emotion, there are some haunting highlights, especially the quiet ballad that accompanies "that balcony scene" (which cleverly here involves Juliet standing on top of her caravan). It's those moments of black humour that lift what could have been car crash trash cinema into something with truly cult potential."

== Awards ==
2013 Rialto Channel New Zealand Film Awards

- Best Cinematography: Tim Flower – nominated
- Best Costume Design: Morgan Albrecht – nominated
- Best Production Design: Haley Williams – nominated
