= Proud Scum =

Proud Scum was a notable punk band in New Zealand punk's second wave. Proud Scum were formed in Auckland in 1979 and attracted a hardcore punk and bootboy following.

Formed from members of punk bands Rooter and The Atrocities, Proud Scum were: Jonathan Jamrag (Griffiths) (vocals), John Atrocity (Jenkins) (guitar), Alastair Rabbit (Duguid) (bass), and Bruce Diode (Hoffman) (drums). Atrocity left in June 1979 (replaced by Sid Scum).

Atrocity's departure was inspiration for one of the band's best known tracks, "Suicide 2", which encourages him to "...jump off Grafton Bridge". They are also known for the tracks "I am a Rabbit" (covered by The Lemonheads for their debut EP in 1986), and "Suicide". All of which are on the defining New Zealand punk compilation album, AK79. Proud Scum also released a shared 7" single with The Terrorways in 1980.

The band (without Rabbit) relocated to Sydney in 1980 before disbanding in 1981. Proud Scum had a reunion in the early 1980s, and reformed for the AK79 reunion show in Auckland, November 2008. According to the band's official MySpace page they are currently located in Sydney, Australia and were recording for a Toy Love tribute album, Stitched Up (as of 2010).

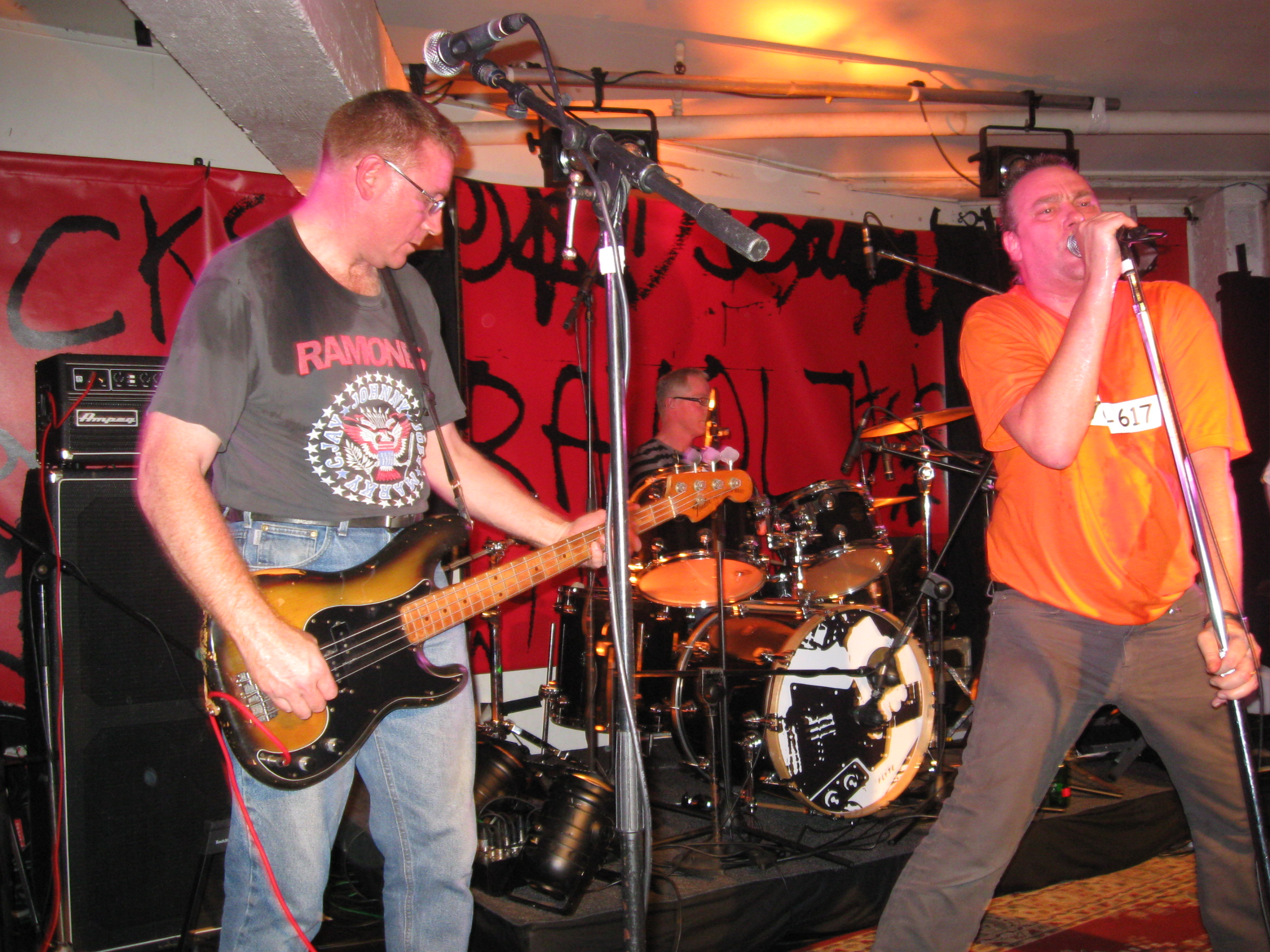
Proud Scum playing at the Monte Cristo Room, Auckland, 22 November 2008

== Sources ==
- "Proud Scum – Auckland punk's second wave".
- "Jamrag interview". Archived from the original on 23 February 2013.
- "Proud Scum at Last FM".
- "Proud Scum – part discography". Discogs.
