= AK79 =

Compilation album by various artists
- Released: December 1979
- Genre: Punk
- Label: Ripper Records

AK79 is a collection of unreleased tracks by punk bands active in Auckland, New Zealand in the late 1970s. The album was compiled by Bryan Staff, with artwork from Terence Hogan, and was released by Ripper Records in December 1979.

== History ==
Bands featured on the original compilation include The Scavengers, The Swingers, The Primmers, Proud Scum, Toy Love and The Terrorways. An initial pressing of 500 was sold to a retailer. It was later reissued on LP and cassette via CBS, but deleted in 1982. Often considered the defining record of the Auckland punk scene, it became rare and sought-after over the next decade.

An expanded and remastered CD version of the compilation was compiled by Simon Grigg and Roger Shepherd. This was released jointly by their record labels Propeller Records and Flying Nun Records in November 1993. This issue was expanded to include tracks by The Suburban Reptiles, The Spelling Mistakes, The Features and The Marching Girls, and additional titles from the bands on the original album.

The reissue was remastered and partially remixed by Grigg, with expanded artwork by Andrew B. White. The liner notes were by Grigg, Staff and Terrorways drummer Kerry Buchanan.

On 21 and 22 November 2008 a number of the bands got together for a reunion gig (compered by Bryan Staff) in Auckland, including The Scavengers, Proud Scum, The Terrorways and The Spelling Mistakes. Neither The Terrorways or Proud Scum had performed since 1980.

A bootleg two-LP edition of AK79, with further unreleased tracks and a 20-page book (including commentary from 30 band members and original punks) was sold at the reunion gig, as well as AK79 T-shirts and other memorabilia.

AllMusic reviewer Chris Woodstra called AK79 "probably the best compilation of New Zealand's entries for punk rock and new wave of the late '70s". Music writer Nick Bollinger included AK79 in his 2009 book 100 Essential New Zealand Albums.

In 2014 the album was named as the second recipient of the Independent Music NZ Classic Record award, presented as part of the 2014 Taite Music Prize.

AK79 was reissued on CD in a remastered version in December 2019 and on double vinyl by Propeller Records and Flying Nun Records in January 2020. It featured the original Ripper Records label design and was the first time the CD tracklisting was released on vinyl.

== Track listing ==
No.	Title	Artist	Length
1.	"Mysterex"	The Scavengers	3:44
2.	"Never Been To Borstal"	The Terrorways	2:04
3.	"I Am A Rabbit"	Proud Scum	1:49
4.	"True Love"	The Scavengers	2:39
5.	"Suicide"	Proud Scum	1:36
6.	"She's A Mod"	The Terrorways	1:50
7.	"Certain Sound"	The Swingers	3:30
8.	"Funny Stories"	The Primmers	2:24
9.	"Squeeze"	Toy Love	3:25
10.	"Baby"	The Swingers	3:10
11.	"You're Gonna Get Done"	The Primmers	3:15
12.	"Toy Love Song"	Toy Love	2:41

1993 reissue
No.	Title	Artist	Length
1.	"Megaton"	Suburban Reptiles	4:28
2.	"Coup D'Etat"	Suburban Reptiles	1:28
3.	"Routine"	The Scavengers	2:07
4.	"Mysterex"	The Scavengers	3:44
5.	"Never Been To Borstal"	The Terrorways	2:04
6.	"I Am A Rabbit"	Proud Scum	1:49
7.	"True Love"	The Scavengers	2:39
8.	"Suicide"	Proud Scum	1:36
9.	"She's A Mod"	The Terrorways	1:50
10.	"Certain Sound"	The Swingers	3:30
11.	"Funny Stories"	The Primmers	2:24
12.	"Squeeze"	Toy Love	3:25
13.	"Baby"	The Swingers	3:10
14.	"You're Gonna Get Done"	The Primmers	3:15
15.	"Toy Love Song"	Toy Love	2:41
16.	"Saturday Night Stay At Home"	Suburban Reptiles	2:47
17.	"Suicide 2"	Proud Scum	3:23
18.	"Short Haired Rock'n Roll"	Terrorways	2:06
19.	"City Scenes"	Features	3:28
20.	"Feel So Good"	The Spelling Mistakes	2:29
21.	"First In Line"	The Marching Girls	2:47
22.	"Frogs"	Toy Love	4:45
23.	"Victim"	Features	3:28
24.	"Hate Me Hate Me"	The Spelling Mistakes	1:58
25.	"True Love"	The Marching Girls	2:58

2008 reissue
No.	Title	Artists	Length
1.	"Mysterex"	The Scavengers	3:44
2.	"Never Been To Borstal"	The Terrorways	2:04
3.	"I Am A Rabbit"	Proud Scum	1:49
4.	"True Love"	The Scavengers	2:39
5.	"Suicide"	Proud Scum	1:36
6.	"She's A Mod"	The Terrorways	1:50
7.	"Certain Sound"	The Swingers	3:30
8.	"Funny Stories"	The Primmers	2:24
9.	"Squeeze"	Toy Love	3:25
10.	"Baby"	The Swingers	3:10
11.	"You're Gonna Get Done"	The Primmers	3:15
12.	"Toy Love Song"	Toy Love	2:41
13.	"Saturday Night Stay At Home"	Suburban Reptiles	2:47
14.	"Born To Bullshit"	The Scavengers
15.	"Stingy"	The Spelling Mistakes
16.	"Hate Me, Hate Me"	The Spelling Mistakes
17.	"Sheep"	Toy Love
18.	"Suicide 2"	Proud Scum	3:23
19.	"Short Haired Rock'n Roll"	Terrorways	2:06
20.	"Somebody's Gonna Get Their Head Kicked In Tonight"	Rooter
21.	"Mysterex (Version 2)"	The Scavengers
22.	"Pull Down The Shades"	The Enemy
23.	"Police Wheels"	The Primmers
24.	"Stage"	The Superettes
25.	"1978"	Toy Love
26.	"First In Line"	Marching Girls
27.	"Toilet"	The Features
28.	"Party"	The Features
