= Hurtling Through =

Studio album by Tiny Ruins
- Released: 27 November 2015
- Genre: Rock
- Label: Bella Union
- Producers: Hollie Fullbrook; Hamish Kilgour; Gary Olson

Hurtling Through is a joint effort EP /mini-album by Hollie Fullbrook, Tiny Ruins, and Hamish Kilgour of The Clean.

== Background ==
In 2013, Hollie Fullbrook met Hamish Kilgour in New York City and they did some shows together. On the final day of their string of shows, they recorded two tracks with producer Gary Olson in a basement studio. That was the start of it. The following year, Fullbrook went back to the States and she and Kilgour recorded more tracks.

Songs from the album were performed live in March 2016 for Radio New Zealand by Fullbrook, Kilgour, Zac Arnold, and Gary Hunt.

== Reviews ==
Reviewer Anne Toller of the Sydney Morning Herald The album has hints of a British folk revival sound, and of raga, with drumming by Kilgour pushing the style of Hollie Fullbrook into a folk psych direction.

== Releases ==
Hurtling Through (LP)Bella Union Bella 515VFlying Nun Records FN558
Pos	Song title	time	Notes
A1	"Tread Softly"		
A2	"Hurtling Through"		
A3	"Turn Around"		
B1	"Little Did I Know"		
B2	"Wandering Aengus"		
B3	"Public Menace"		
B4	"King's County"		

Hurtling Through (CD)Spunk Records URA 477Flying Nun Records URA 477
Pos	Song title	time	Notes
1	"Tread Softly"		
2	"Hurtling Through"		
3	"Turn Around"		
4	"Little Did I Know"		
5	"Wandering Aengus"		
6	"Public Menace"		
7	"King's County"		

== Personnel ==
Musicians

- Hollie Fullbrook - Acoustic Guitar, Electric Guitar, Vocals, Cello, Organ, Dulcimer
- Hamish Kilgour - Drums, Percussion, Wind Chimes, Jew's Harp, Harmonica, Shaker, Guiro, Tambourine, Tabla, Spoons
- Danny Tunick - Bass (tracks: A3, B2), Vibraphone
- Greg Vegas - Saxophone
- (Uncredited) - Cello

Production

- Chris Chetland - Mastering
- Gary Olson - Mixing, Production, Recording
- Hollie Fullbrook - Production
- Hamish Kilgour - Production
