= Suburban Reptiles =

New Zealand punk rock band

The Suburban Reptiles
- Origin: Auckland, New Zealand
- Genres: Punk
- Years active: 1976–1978
- Labels: Vertigo
- Past members: Simon Grigg; Brett "Jimmy Joy/ Jimmy Vinyl/ Lino Clone" Salter; William "Billy Planet" Pendergrast; Clare "Sally Slag/ Zero" Elliot (died 26 March 2024); Trish "Sissy Spunk" Scott; Bryan "Shaun Anfrayd" Nicholls; Kim Smith; Des Edwards; Mark "Buster Stiggs" Hough; Johnny Volume; Wayne "Bones Hillman" Stevens; Tony Baldock; Roland Killeen; Phil Judd

The Suburban Reptiles were one of the first two punk bands to form in New Zealand, the other being the Scavengers.

== History ==
The Suburban Reptiles were conceptualised by Auckland students Simon Grigg and Brett Salter in late 1976, with some encouragement from filmmaker David Blyth. Grigg and Salter had originally planned to form a jazz band, but Grigg was redirected by Blyth after he saw a live review of the Sex Pistols in the New Musical Express.

Grigg, seeing himself as the manager, explained the concept to Salter, who played the saxophone, and other students, William Pendergrast, bass guitar; Clare Elliot, (Salter's partner), vocals; Trish Scott, guitar; Brian Nicholls, guitar; and Kim Smith, backing vocals, were invited to join. Grigg found a drummer, an apprentice butcher and part-time juggler, Des Edwards, and the original lineup was complete. This group only lasted the first few practices in a basement in Ponsonby, an inner suburb of Auckland, before Smith and Edwards departed. The first practices did produce the nucleus of a live set, consisting of a mix of covers (including songs from Roxy Music, the Damned and the Modern Lovers) and originals.

The only live show by this lineup was an late night performance, planned on the night, in the University of Auckland's Student Quadrangle, which was aborted when the power was pulled by a University custodian after one song to a bemused crowd fresh from a concert by Th' Dudes. The Suburban Reptiles had thought they were the only 'punks' in Auckland, until earlier that evening, when they went to the Globe hotel and encountered the members of the Scavengers, who likewise had believed they were the only ones.

A drummer was now needed and Salter and Elliot had a chance encounter with Mark Hough, who had been playing in a band called After Hours, with Neil Finn. Hough, an art student at Elam (Auckland University's Fine Arts School), was asked to join and the first serious lineup was formed. The members then, in the tradition of punk bands the world over, took stage names: Salter initially became Jimmy Vinyl and later Jimmy Joy and Lino Clone; Elliot took Sally Slag but quickly became simply Zero (although to the band she was simply Zed); Nicholls was Shaun Anfrayd; Pendergrast naturally identified with his (highly strung) Buzz Adrenalin but opted for the more user friendly Billy Planet; Scott was Sissy Spunk; and Hough, though wanting Buzz, became Buster Stiggs. Grigg used the name Partizan Politik as a management coverall.

The first performances were at a variety of private parties in April 1977, but the first major public performance was in June when they, with the Scavengers, and another newly found band, The Masochists, played a party put on by Grigg and David Blyth, for Blyth's forthcoming film, Angel Mine.

Over the next couple of months the band played regularly, although Scott and Nicholls left, with the Scavengers' Johnny Volume playing from time to time before Pendergrast moved to guitar and Wayne 'Bones Hillman' Stevens from the Masochists joined on bass, the name Hillman coming from the brand of car he drove. Over the period the band was fired from a Catholic Boys School; was pursued and vilified by a hungry media, repeatedly making the front pages of various newspapers; and were attacked by a vigilante mob at a student arts festival in Wellington.

They also, during this period, recorded their first single, a double A side single (the first released in New Zealand). The first recording sessions were nominally produced by Tim Finn (although he slept through much of the session) at Harlequin Studios in Mount Eden, and produced four tracks, at the time unreleased. The second session a few weeks later, produced by the band and Doug Rogers, re-recorded two of those songs, "Megaton" and "Desert Patrol", and these, after some gestation came out on Phonogram's Vertigo label in January 1978, selling about 500 copies at the time.

In late 1977 Grigg departed and Hough proclaimed himself the de facto manager, with the band taking on the role of a more conventional touring act thereafter. However, in mid 1978 Zero was arrested for swearing on stage at the Riverhead Rock Festival. The subsequent court case and her acquittal set a legal precedent as to what could be said and where. Over that period, both Tony Baldock and Rolland Killeen played bass for the band at various times.

For the second single, not all the band were pleased that former Split Enz guitarist Phil Judd became involved and offered to produce. Judd became more and more part of the band over the following months. His arrival and the subsequent fawning caused a great deal of friction between the members who effectively divided into two camps, with Judd and tag-along Hough on one side and Pendergrast and Salter on the other, with Zero in the middle. Drug issues also exacerbated tensions which self-managed high-adrenaline highly-creative youth bands are ill-equipped to self-manage. The band were intending to record "Mamba" as the next single but Judd decided to re-write, play all guitars and produce his old mate's song. Planet left them all to it, did not attend any further recording sessions and effectively left the band. The resultant single, "Saturday Night Stay at Home", with Judd's soaring guitar and little else audible or recognisable of the Suburban Reptiles, was an instant classic, selling hundreds of copies. A Student Radio survey in the early 2000s named it the greatest New Zealand single of all time. However, New Zealand was denied the recording of what could have been the country's definitive punk album.

We started off recording on low quality sixes between 1 o'clock and 5 o'clock in the morning, when the recording studios charged the least. As our first songs became popular, we were able to record high quality twenty-fours, in good studios at reasonable times. – Brett Salter

It was too late for the Suburban Reptiles however and, at the premiere of Angel Mine in October 1978, two bands both played under that name. The Hough / Judd led band re-emerged some months later as the Swingers.

== Discography ==
=== Singles ===
Date	Label	Cat. Number	Tracks
6 February 1978	Vertigo	6036 920	"Megaton" / "Desert Patrol"
8/1978	Vertigo	6036 924	"Saturday Night Stay At Home" / "45 Single"

=== Tracks on compilations ===
- "Saturday Night Stay At Home" on Hits and Myths (1982)
- "Saturday Night Stay At Home", "Megaton", and "Coup d'État" on AK79 Reissue (1992)
- "Saturday Night Stay At Home" on Hate Your Neighbours Vol.1 (1997)
- "45 Single" on Move To Riot (2002)
- "Saturday Night Stay At Home" on Give It a Whirl (2003)
