= Dana Rotberg =

Mexican film director (born 1960)

Dana Rotberg is a Mexican film director now based in New Zealand. She was born in Mexico City in 1960.

Her film Angel of Fire (Angel de fuego) questions whether a feminist quest in Mexico is even possible. The film was screened for the Directors' Fortnight at the 1992 Cannes Film Festival.

Rotberg's first English-language feature film is the 2013 New Zealand release, White Lies.
