= AudioCulture =

Online music project in New Zealand

- Native name: Iwi Waiata
- Company type: Nonprofit
- Website type: Digital library
- Available in: English
- Headquarters: Wellington, New Zealand
- Owners: NZ On Air, New Zealand Government
- Website: Official website
- Commercial: No
- Launched: May 2013
- Current status: Perpetual work-in-progress

AudioCulture (Māori: Iwi Waiata) is a New Zealand On Air funded online project billed as the "Noisy Library of New Zealand Music". Working with artists, historians and music industry figures, the website covers the nearly 100 years of New Zealand music culture and history, from the first local recordings in the 1920s to the advent of digital streaming. The pages curate together original research and writing on prominent musicians, releases, and movements, alongside resources like music videos and photographs.

The website launched on 31 May 2013 with 250 published pages, and since then has been growing steadily with new pages and stories added regularly. As of 2023 there were more than 2,000 pages.

== History ==
The site was conceived and founded by New Zealand music industry pioneer and historian Simon Grigg. Grigg first conceived an online database of New Zealand music in the late 2000s and spent much of the next few years seeking funding and gathering support from the music industry in New Zealand. Backed by Recorded Music New Zealand, he approached various funding bodies but was repeatedly turned down.

In 2012, NZ On Air agreed to fund the site and its operations. AudioCulture was placed under the wing of the same trust in charge of its sibling project NZ On Screen, but the content would be curated and directed by Grigg, who would serve as the Creative Director. Under him, content was created by some 35 writers and contributed to by a large number of photographers. The site launched on 31 May 2013, featuring an initial 250 pages, later expanding to over 2,000 pages by its 10th birthday in 2023.

In September 2016, Grigg resigned as Creative Director, handing the role to New Zealand writer and historian Chris Bourke. Grigg retains a position as founding editor.

AudioCulture has partnerships with The National Library of New Zealand, and NZ On Screen. In 2018, researcher Gareth Shute mapped the live music venues of Auckland over the 1950s to the 1980s as part of an Auckland Library Heritage Trust research grant.
