= Deleyaman =

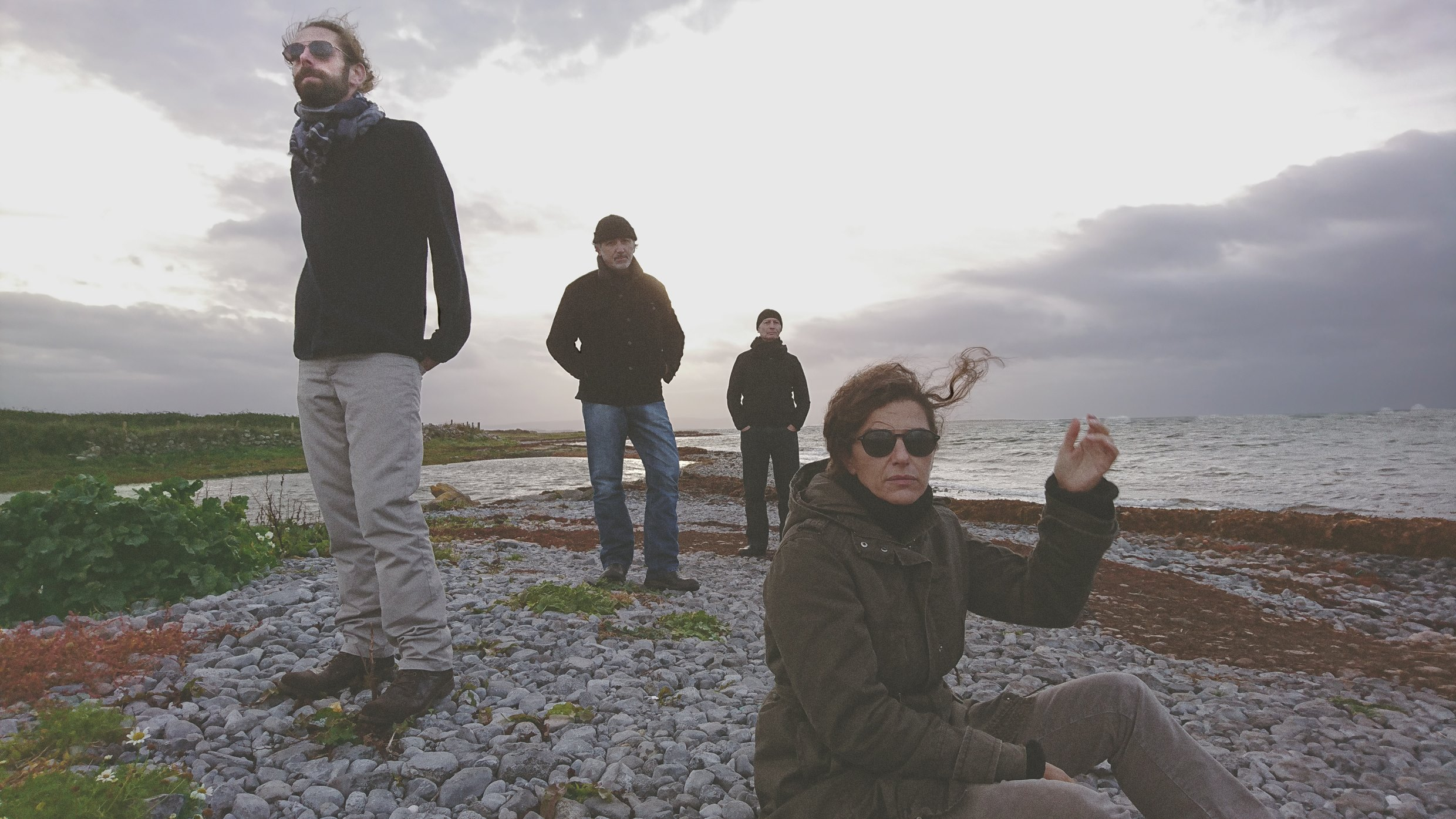
- Deleyaman in Kilcolgan in October 2018

Background information
- Origin: Normandy, France
- Genres: Art rock; indie rock; avant garde; world music; dark wave; post-punk; post-rock
- Years active: 2000–present
- Labels: Equilibrium Music; Éditions Nech; TTO Records
- Members: Aret Madilian; Beatrice Valantin; Artyom Minasyan; Benoît Fournier; Gerard Madilian
- Past members: Mia Bjorlingsson; Ara Duzian; Guillaume Leprevost
- Website: deleyaman.com

Deleyaman is a French-American musical band founded in Normandy, France in 2000 by the American multi-instrumentalist of Greek-Armenian origins Aret Madilian from Los Angeles, along with French singer Beatrice Valantin and French-Armenian duduk player Gerard Madilian.

The band is referenced as the first alternative rock band to have included the ancient wind instrument the duduk in their line-up. Deleyaman's musical universe has been described as poetic, melancholic, introspective. A multi-genre band which assemble art-rock, dark wave, minimalism, post-punk and post-rock.

== History ==
The band originally consisting of Aret Madilian, Beatrice Valantin and Gerard Madilian released their debut album 00/1, in September 2001 on Editions Nech Records, an independent world music label based in Paris. The album was released in France and in Europe and received reviews and support from the underground musical press such as Elegy, D-Side, Obskure, Uncut.

The following albums entitled Second (2003) and 3 (2006) received wider recognition and were also to be released on the French label Editions Nech Records. Two tracks from Second "Battlefield" and "Black Rainbow", were chosen by the French actress and film director Fanny Ardant for the soundtrack of her 2017 film Le Divan de Staline starring Gerard Depardieu and Emmanuelle Seigner.

In 2009 Deleyaman released the first of their two part album Fourth, part one. Fourth, part two was released in 2011. The band's sixth album The Edge, was released July 4, 2014. The German weekly Der Spiegel has referenced the album on "Die wichtigste Musik der Woche" (The most important music of the week) section.

The following album The lover, The stars & The citadel, was released on November 18, 2016. It includes Brendan Perry of Dead Can Dance guesting as instrumentalist on two of the album's tracks.

In 2017, Deleyaman's cover version of "Bir sana Bir de Bana", the Turkish song originally written by the psychedelic-oriental dub band Baba Zula appeared in BaBa ZuLa's 20th anniversary album XX released in January 2017 on Glitterhouse Records.

In October 2018, Deleyaman & Jules Maxwell toured Ireland and the UK playing in Limerick, Galway, Lisdoonvarna, Carlow, Dublin, Dundalk and Portaferry and guesting on BBC Radio Ulster's John Toal show.

The eight album Sentinel, including contributions from Brendan Perry and Jules Maxwell, was released on January 17, 2020.

A new album The Sudbury Inn was released on June 9, 2023.

They collaborated with French actress Fanny Ardant for a night of poetry and music in 2021, 2022 and 2023

== Band members ==
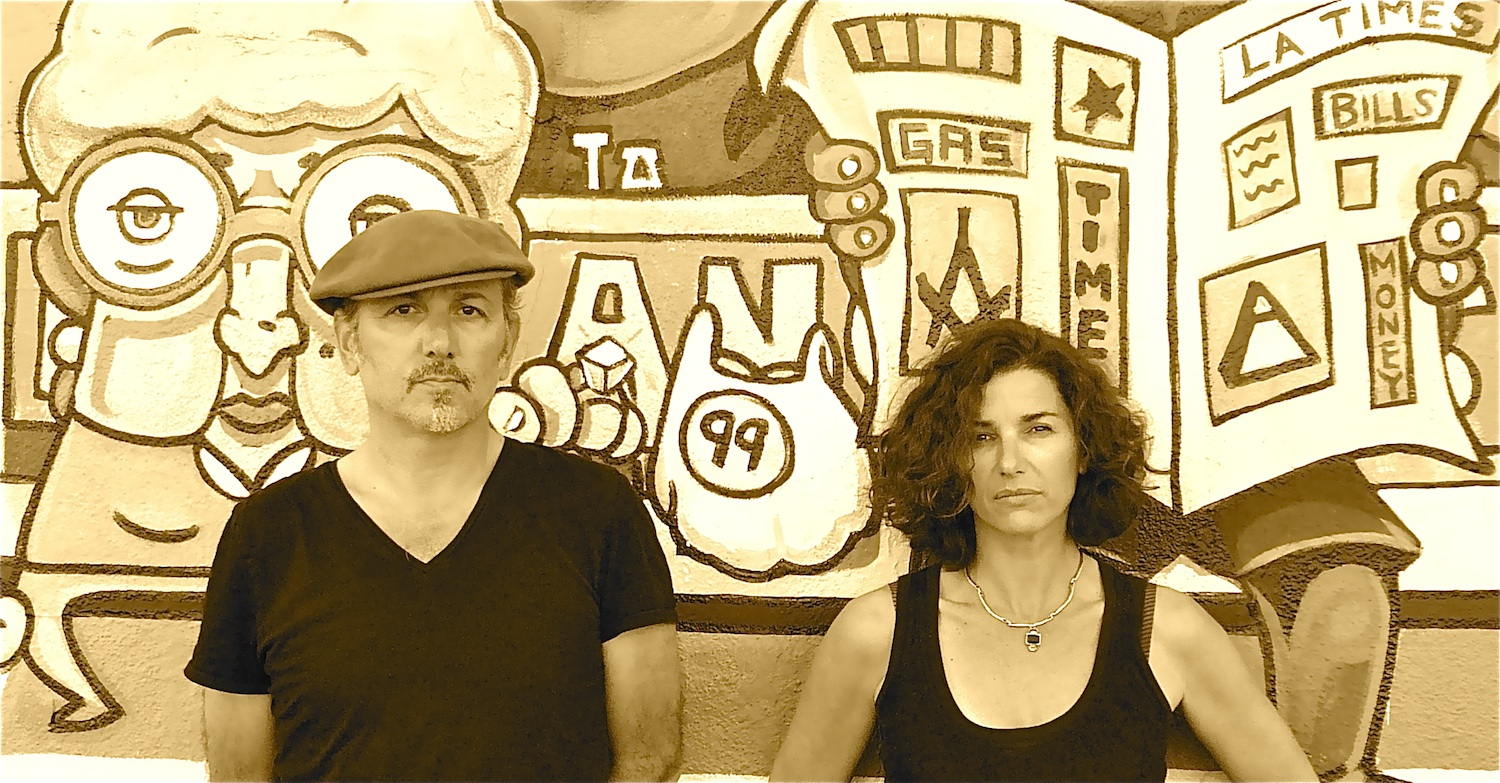
Aret Madilian and Beatrice Valantin

Current members

- Aret Madilian – guitar, bass, keyboards, vocals, percussions
- Beatrice Valantin – vocals, keyboards
- Artyom Minasyan – duduk, pku, blul
- Benoit Fournier – drums
- Gerard Madilian – duduk

Former members

- Mia Bjorlingsson – drums
- Ara Duzian – guitar
- Guillaume Leprevost – bass, guitar

== Discography ==
Album	Year	Label
00/1	2001	Editions Nech
Second	2003	Editions Nech
3	2006	Editions Nech
Fourth, part one	2009	TTO Records & Naregatsi Art Institute (USA); Equilibrium Music (Europe)
Fourth, part two	2011	TTO Records & Naregatsi Art Institute (USA); Equilibrium Music (Europe)
The Edge	2014	TTO Records
The lover, The stars & The citadel	2016	TTO Records
Sentinel	2020	TTO Records
The Sudbury Inn	2023	TTO Records
