= Ark (Brendan Perry album) =

Studio album by Brendan Perry
- Released: (31 March 2010, concert sale); 7 June 2010 (world)
- Recorded: Quivvy Studios, Ireland
- Genre: Ambient music, downtempo, neoclassical dark wave, world music
- Length: 55:04
- Label: Cooking Vinyl
- Producer: Brendan Perry

Brendan Perry chronology
| Eye of the Hunter (1999) | Ark (2010) |

Ark is the second solo album by Brendan Perry, the male half of the band Dead Can Dance. It was Perry's first studio album in 11 years. It was first made available to the public as part of a limited 2,000-copy autographed pre-release offered at a concert in Prague on 31 March 2010 and subsequent shows. It was officially released worldwide by Cooking Vinyl on 7 June 2010.

== Track listing ==
All tracks are written by Brendan Perry

| No. | Title | Length |
|---|---|---|
| 1. | "Babylon" | 6:08 |
| 2. | "The Bogus Man" | 6:11 |
| 3. | "Wintersun" | 6:02 |
| 4. | "Utopia" | 5:56 |
| 5. | "Inferno" | 6:38 |
| 6. | "This Boy" | 6:59 |
| 7. | "The Devil and the Deep Blue Sea" | 7:35 |
| 8. | "Crescent" | 9:35 |
| Total length: | | 55:04 |

== Personnel ==
Musical

- Brendan Perry – writer, composer, performer

Technical

- Mastered by Aidan Foley at Masterlabs

Graphical

- Sleeve design by Graham Wood
- Photography (front cover) by Dan Van Winkle
- Photography (inner cover) by Sophia Wood

== Charts ==
| Chart (2010) | Peak position |
|---|---|
| Polish Albums Chart | 27 |
