= Rosmini College =

Location
- 36 Dominion Street; Auckland, 0622; New Zealand; 36°47′32.71″S 174°45′36.40″E

Information
- Type: State-integrated secondary
- Motto: Legis Charitas Plenitudo (Charity Fulfills the Law)
- Religious affiliation: Roman Catholic
- Established: 1962; 64 years ago
- Ministry of Education Institution no.: 39
- Principal: Nixon Cooper
- Gender: Boys
- Enrolment: 1,208 (July 2026)
- Socio-economic decile: 9Q
- Website: rosmini.school.nz

Rosmini College is a state integrated Catholic secondary school for boys, situated in Takapuna, Auckland, New Zealand. The proprietor of the school is the Bishop of Auckland. The school caters to Years 7–13 (Forms 1–7), and currently has a roll of approximately 1120 students and staff of 75 teachers. The school's motto is Legis Charitas Plenitudo, translated as 'Charity Fulfills the Law', or sometimes translated as 'Love Fulfills the Law'.

Founded in 1962 by its first headmaster, Father Phillip Catcheside, the school was named after Antonio Rosmini, founder of the Institute of Charity. In 1969, several Rosmini College staff, Fathers S Marriott and B Hogan, and Brothers J Tedesco and E Willett left to establish St Peter's College, Gore in the Southland Region. Tom Gerrard was the school's principal from 1976 until 2014, making him New Zealand's longest serving principal. Gerrard died in 2020.

== Enrolment ==
As of July 2026, the school has a roll of 1,208 students, of which 121 (10.0%) identify as Māori.

As of 2026, the school has an Equity Index of 387, placing it amongst schools whose students have the fewest socioeconomic barriers to achievement (roughly equivalent to deciles 9 and 10 under the former socio-economic decile system).

== Facilities ==
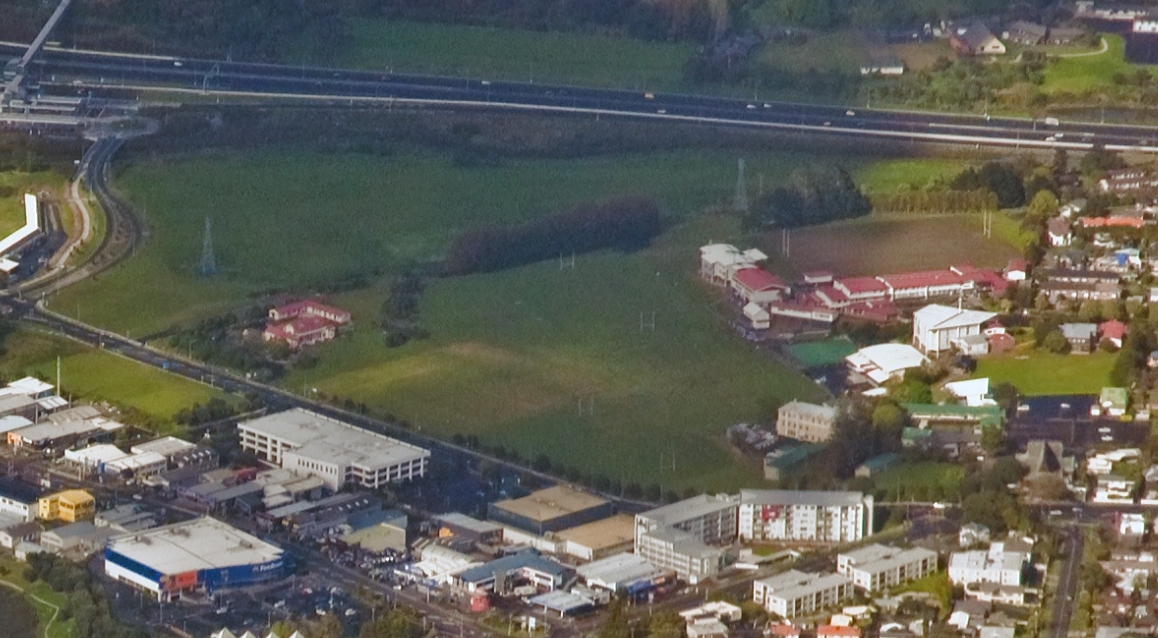
An aerial view of Rosmini College grounds, 2010

The school's buildings include the Tindall Auditorium and school chapel, a purpose-built music block, the Maire Technology Block, the Sormany Science Centre, main block (containing classrooms, computer labs, administration facilities, staff offices, and the school library), and several prefabs. The school also has two gymnasiums as well as extensive sports fields and courts. The Tom Gerrard Gymnasium, named in honour of the school's longest serving principal, was formally opened in July 2009 by Bishop Pat Dunn.

== Academic ==
The school's curriculum mirrors that of state schools, apart from the addition of religious education classes and associated prayers, retreats, and masses. These religious activities and the promotion of Christian values constitute the school's Catholic character. The school's enrolment policy favours boys from Catholic primary schools, although students of other denominations fill the remaining space on the roll, in accordance with government funding legislation for integrated schools.

New Zealand's national secondary qualification, the National Certificate of Educational Achievement, is offered to all year 11–13 students. In 2017, in Auckland’s North Shore, the highest NCEA pass rate at level 3 went to Rosmini College with 96 per cent.

== Sports ==
Sport is an integral part of Rosmini life, and the school has enjoyed success at regional level in many sports, particularly rugby, scoring 20 wins against state-school opponents, Westlake Boys High School in 2013. In 1980, the college's senior football team won the National Secondary Schools Football Championship. The college's senior basketball team won a New Zealand National Secondary Schools title in 2011, 2017 and 2018.

== Music and performing arts ==
The college has purpose-built facilities for the teaching of music and performing arts. The school has a small jazz band and choir, in addition to solo performers and rock bands. Rosmini also holds drama productions with sister school Carmel College. In June 2024, the school's 55-voice Chamber Choir won Gala Concert Performance Award for their Auckland Town Hall performance of Mel Brooks' Men in Tights at 'The Big Sing', a nationwide choral festival managed by the New Zealand Choral Federation.

== Principals ==
- Father Phillip Catcheside CI (1962–72)
- Four principals (names unrecorded) in the years 1973-1975
- Tom Gerrard (1976–2014)
- Nixon Cooper (2014–present)

== Notable alumni ==
- Gareth Anscombe – former Chiefs, Auckland, and New Zealand secondary schools rugby representative.
- Liam Barry – former All Black
- Adrian Blincoe – New Zealand middle distance running representative
- Anthony Boric – rugby union player; former All Black
- Martin Brill – Olympic fencing representative
- Graham Dowd – former All Black
- Chris Drum – former Black Cap
- Julius Halaifonua – basketball player
- Max Hicks – rugby union player
- Keano Kini – rugby league player
- David Kosoof – former Black Stick
- Blair Larsen – former All Black
- Damian Light – politician
- Moses Mackay – musician/actor, 1/3 of award-winning trio Sol3 Mio
- Mark Mitchell – Member of Parliament for Rodney (2011–present)
- Taine Murray – New Zealand basketball player currently with the Virginia Cavaliers
- Dominic O'Sullivan (born 1970) - political scientist
- John O'Sullivan – New Zealand rugby league international
- Kruz Perrott-Hunt – basketball player
- Jacob Pierce – rugby union player
- Chris Pringle – former Black Cap
- Derone Raukawa – basketball player
- Ethan Roots – rugby union player
- Tony Scheirlinck – former All White
- The Screaming Meemees – members: Tony Drumm, Lawrence "Yoh" Landwer-Johan, Peter van der Fluit, Michael O'Neill
- Gordon Simpson – rugby union player
- Tohi Smith-Milner – basketball player
- Martin Snedden – former Black Cap, sports administrator, 2011 Rugby World Cup CEO
- Scott Talbot – swimmer and coach
- Peter van der Fluit – musician, composer, writer, producer
- Jack Whetton – rugby union player
- Derek Williams – composer, conductor, orchestrator
- Rudi Wulf – former All Black
