= Polar T3 syndrome =

Low hormone levels in polar explorers

Polar T_{3} syndrome is a condition found in polar explorers, caused by a decrease in levels of the thyroid hormone T_{3}. Its effects include forgetfulness, cognitive impairment and mood disturbances. It can exhibit itself in a fugue state known as the Antarctic stare.

Effects of polar environment conditions (long term coldness or bioactive factors) are proposed as hypothetical causes of this syndrome.

It is regarded as one of the contributory causes of winter-over syndrome.

== See also ==
- Antarctica: A Year on Ice
