= Tiny Ruins =

New Zealand indie folk band

- Origin: Auckland, New Zealand
- Genre: Indie folk
- Years active: 2009–present
- Labels: Spunk Records; Own Records; Flying Nun; Arch Hill; Ursa Minor; Milk!; Marathon Artists; Ba Da Bing
- Members: Hollie Fullbrook (vocals, guitar); Cass Basil (bass); Alexander Freer (drums); Tom Healy (guitar)

Tiny Ruins are a musical ensemble from Auckland, New Zealand.

== History ==
Tiny Ruins began as an alias for singer-songwriter Hollie Fullbrook, who recorded as a solo artist prior to 2009. Fullbrook recorded an EP with singer-songwriter Lieven Scheerlink in 2010 under the name Tiny Ruins and toured Europe for the first time with him and Ana Franco from Coffee & Wine. In 2011, she recorded the full-length Some Were Meant for Sea. She then opened for Fleet Foxes and toured internationally with Calexico and Beach House. After adding Cass Basil and Alexander Freer to the lineup, Tiny Ruins recorded a second album, Brightly Painted One, which was released in 2014. Guitarist Tom Healy and violinist Siobhanne Thompson performed on the album and appeared with the group on subsequent tours. Brightly Painted One was awarded Best Alternative Album at the New Zealand Music Awards in November 2014.

In 2016, Fullbrook teamed up with Hamish Kilgour and former Terrorways, Gary Havoc & The Hurricanes drummer Gary Hunt for the Hurtling Through release.

All four Tiny Ruins albums have been shortlisted for the Taite Music Prize.

== Discography ==
=== Studio albums ===
List of studio albums, with selected chart positions
Title	Album details	Peak chart positions
Title	Album details	NZ
Some Were Meant for Sea	Released: 1 May 2011; Label: Spunk Records, Own Records; Formats: CD, LP, digital download, streaming	35
Brightly Painted One	Released: 5 May 2014; Label: Flying Nun Records, Spunk, Arch Hill Recordings; Formats: CD, LP, cassette, digital download, streaming	19
Olympic Girls	Released: 1 February 2019; Label: Ursa Minor, Milk! Records, Marathon Artists, Ba Da Bing!; Formats: CD, LP, digital download, streaming	11
Ceremony	Released: 28 April 2023; Label: Ursa Minor, Milk!, Marathon, Ba Da Bing!; Formats: CD, LP, digital download, streaming	9

=== Extended plays ===
List of extended plays
Title	Album details
Little Notes (with A Singer of Songs)	Released: 6 December 2010; Label: Underused Records, HI54LOFI Records; Formats: CD, digital download, streaming
Haunts	Released: 19 April 2013; Label: Spunk; Formats: CD, 10", digital download, streaming
Hurtling Through (Tiny Ruins & Hamish Kilgour)	Released: 27 November 2015; Label: Bella Union, Flying Nun, Spunk; Formats: CD, 12", digital download, streaming

=== Singles ===
List of singles, showing year released and album name
Title	Year	Album
"Me at the Museum, You in the Wintergardens"	2014	Brightly Painted One
"Carriages"	2014	Brightly Painted One
"Dream Wave"	2016	Non-album single
"How Much"	2018	Olympic Girls
"Olympic Girls"	2018	Olympic Girls
"School of Design"	2018	Olympic Girls
"Holograms"	2019	Olympic Girls
"One Million Flowers"	2019	Olympic Girls (Solo)
"My Love Leda"	2019	Olympic Girls (Solo)
"The Crab / Waterbaby"	2023	Ceremony
"Dorothy Bay"	2023	Ceremony
"Dogs Dreaming"	2023	Ceremony
"Out of Phase"	2023	Ceremony

=== Other charted songs ===
Title	Year	Peak chart positions	Album
Title	Year	NZ Artist	Album
"Bird in the Thyme"	2014	6	Some Were Meant for Sea
