= Lieven Scheerlinck =

Belgian folk singer-songwriter

Lieven Scheelinck is a Belgian folk singer-songwriter who lives in Barcelona. He records under the nom-de-plume A Singer of Songs, the name taken from the Johnny Cash song of the same name. His music has been described as 'Low-fi lullaby folk that falls on the ears as gently as snowflakes.'

He collaborated with New Zealand singer-songwriter Hollie Fullbrook (recording as Tiny Ruins) on the EP Little Notes. In May 2010 he toured Northern Spain with Fullbrook and Ana Franco from Coffee & Wine, with the EP being recorded in Scheelinck's flat at the end of the tour. He has also collaborated with Withered Hand (AKA Dan Willson) on the EP Among Horses I. The EP was written and recorded in one week at 'an organic farm in the middle of nowhere.'

== Discography ==
=== Solo Releases ===
1. I Dig For Gold (2008) Self-released
2. Old Happiness (2010) Underused Records, HI54LOFI Records
3. There Is A Home For You (2013) HI54LOFI Records
4. From Hello to Goodbye (2014) Son Canciones
5. Fading (2016) Son Canciones
6. Portraits (2019) Son Canciones

=== Collaborations ===
1. With Tiny Ruins Little Notes (2010) Underused Records, HI54LOFI Records
2. With Withered Hand Among Horses I (2016) Son Canciones
