= Screaming Meemees =

New Zealand post-punk-new wave band

- Origin: New Zealand
- Genres: New wave, post-punk
- Years active: 1980–1982
- Label: Propeller Records
- Past members: Tony Drumm; Lawrence "Yoh" Landwer-Johan; Peter van der Fluit; Michael O'Neill

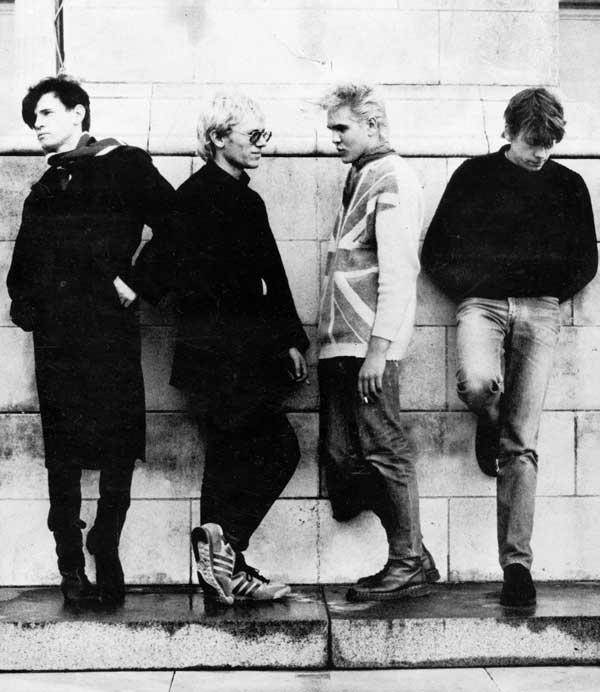
The Screaming Meemees in a promo shot, March 1981.

The Screaming Meemees were a New Zealand post-punk-new wave band formed in the early 1980s. The band formed in Auckland in 1979, while at school at Rosmini College on Auckland's North Shore, composed of vocalist Tony Drumm, guitarist Michael O'Neill, keyboard and bass player Peter van der Fluit and drummer Laurence "Yoh" Landwer-Johan. The band was propelled into the limelight, in part, by the inclusion of their single All Dressed Up in the compilation album Class of 81 produced by Simon Grigg's Propeller Records. By late 1980, the band was at the forefront of what was called the "North Shore Invasion". The Screaming Meemees were named "Most Promising Group" at the 1981 New Zealand Music Awards.

In early 1981, The Screaming Meemees released the single, "Can’t Take It", with The Newmatics’ "Judas" on the flip side. The single sold about 2000 copies and entered the top 40 in New Zealand. This was followed by the "Screaming Blamatic Roadshow", which included label-mates Blam Blam Blam and The Newmatics.

The follow-up single was See Me Go, released as a numbered limited edition 12" edition, and a 7". Despite being unavailable after the initial week of release, the song was briefly the number one single on the New Zealand charts. This accomplishment was achieved with little airplay outside of student radio. The single was the first New Zealand record (album or single) to enter the charts at number one. This was followed by Sunday Boys in December, 1981, which was also a Top 20 single (without airplay).

The band's final single was Stars in My Eyes, released in 1982. By 1983, the band were making their last performances, including a gig at the 1983 Sweetwaters Music Festival. The band split in April 1983 but reformed in August 1983 for two shows. They have not played publicly since.

Guitarist Michael O'Neill died from cancer on 4 December 2025.

== Discography ==
=== Albums ===
Year	Title	Details	Peak chart positions	Certifications
Year	Title	Details	NZ	Certifications
1982	If this is Paradise, I'll Take the Bag	Label: Propeller; Catalogue: REV 203; Reissued in 2009	16	Gold
1992	Stars in My Eyes – Songs & Singles 1979-81	Label: Propeller; Catalogue: REV 501	15	
"—" denotes a recording that did not chart or was not released in that territory.

=== Singles ===
Year	Title	Peak chart positions	Album
Year	Title	NZ	Album
1981	"Can’t Take It"	32	Non-album single
1981	"See Me Go"	1	Seemeego-o EP
1981	"Sunday Boys"	11	If this is Paradise, I'll Take the Bag
1982	"'F' is For Fear"	45	If this is Paradise, I'll Take the Bag
1982	"Stars in My Eyes"	18	Non-album single
"—" denotes a recording that did not chart or was not released in that territory.
