= Sing a Song for You: Tribute to Tim Buckley =

2000 compilation album by various artists

Compilation album by Various Artists
- Released: September 19, 2000
- Recorded: December 1999 – April 2000
- Genres: Folk, rock
- Length: 83:31
- Label: Manifesto
- Producer: Evan Cohen

Professional ratings
Review scores
| Source | Rating |
|---|---|
| AllMusic | 4/5 stars |

Sing a Song for You: Tribute to Tim Buckley is a double CD studio album performed by various artists in tribute to 1960s musician Tim Buckley. The album is named after a Buckley song of the same name which is also the first track on the first disc. Tim Buckley died of an accidental overdose in 1975.

== Track listing ==
All songs by Tim Buckley except: by Tim Buckley and Larry Beckett †

=== Disc 1 ===
1. "Sing a Song for You" performed by Moose - 3:30
2. "Morning Glory"† performed by Simon Raymonde, Anneli Drecker - 4:19
3. "Dream Letter" performed by Brendan Perry - 4:20
4. "Love from Room 109 at the Islander" performed by Mojave 3 - 4:30
5. "Because of You"† performed by The Friendly Science Orchestra - 5:36
6. "Cafe" performed by Mark Lanegan - 5:38
7. "Buzzin' Fly" performed by Shelleyan Orphan - 5:39
8. "I Woke Up"† performed by Mike Johnson - 3:06
9. "Blue Melody" performed by Cousteau - 5:20

=== Disc2 ===
1. "I Must've Been Blind" performed by Heather Duby - 5:34
2. "Sweet Surrender" performed by Dot Allison - 6:01
3. "Pleasant Street" performed by Geneva - 9:15
4. "Strange Feelin'" performed by Lilys - 3:27
5. "Happy Time" performed by The Mad Scene - 3:54
6. "Phantasmagoria in Two" performed by Neil Halstead - 4:37
7. "Once I Was" performed by Tram - 3:56
8. "Song to the Siren"† performed by The Czars - 7:50

== Personnel ==
=== Performers ===
- Mike Johnson - Vocals, Guitar
- Ida Akesson - Piano, Hammond organ
- Dot Allison - keyboards, vocals, Producer, Engineer, Liner Notes
- Paul Anderson - Acoustic Guitar, Harmonica, Arranger, electric guitar, Keyboards, Vocals
- Brent Arnold - Organ, Arranger, Electric Piano, Vibraphone
- Nick Avery - percussion, drums
- Robin Brown - Guitar
- Cody Burns - Guitar
- Douglas Caskie - Drums
- Jen Charowhas - Violin
- Michael Conroy - Bass guitar, Guitar, Strings, Keyboards, Vocals, Vibraphone
- Mick Conroy - Bass guitar, Guitar, Strings, Keyboards, Vocals, Vibraphone
- Cousteau - Performer, Producer, Liner Notes
- Caroline Crawley - Vocals, Voices, Liner Notes
- The Czars - Performer, Producer
- Steven Dora - Guitar
- Anneli Drecker - Performer
- Heather Duby - Vocals, Producer
- Stuart Evans - Guitar
- Alan Forrester - Mellotron
- The Friendly Science Orchestra - Performer
- Geneva - Producer, Performer
- Rachel Goswell - Bass guitar
- Keith Graham - Bass
- John Grant - Piano, Vocals, Voices
- Roger Green - Guitar
- Gary Griffiths - Violin
- Neil Halstead - Acoustic Guitar, Guitar, Vocals, Voices, Producer, Mellotron
- Paul Hammond - Organ, Guitar
- Kurt Heasley - Vocals, Producer, Baritone Guitar
- Mark Howell - Trumpet
- Irving Joseph - Keyboards
- Zeke Keeble - Drums
- Hamish Kilgour - Guitar, Vocals
- Mark Lanegan - Vocals
- Lilys - Performer
- Jeff Linsenmaier - Drums
- Michael Littleton - Bass, Vocals, Megaphone
- The Mad Scene - Performer
- Ian Masters - Guitar, Vocals, Koto, Singer, Musical Saw, Classical Guitar, Liner Notes, Programmed Percussion
- Adam McCollom - Bass
- Ian McCutcheon - Percussion, Drums, Electric guitar
- Liam McKahey - Vocals
- Andy Monley - Guitar
- Andrew Montgomery - Vocals
- Davey Ray Moor - Piano
- Ian Painter - Bass
- John Parish - Slide Guitar
- Joe Peet - Bass
- Brendan Perry - Keyboards, Vocals, Voices, Producer
- Simon Raymonde - Guitar, Piano, Arranger, backing vocals, Producer, Liner Notes, Mixing
- David Rothon - Pedal Steel Guitar
- Simon Rowe - Electric guitar
- Michael Shilling - Drums
- Lisa Siegel - Organ, Guitar, Vocals
- Paul Sinclair - Hammond organ
- Jules Singleton - Violin
- Lisa Sutton - Art Direction
- Mitsuo Tate - Engineer
- Mick Tedder - Bass guitar, Guitar
- Tram - Performer
- Danny Tunick - Drums, Vocals, Vibraphone
- Craig Vear - Percussion, Drums
- Boris Williams - Drums
- Russell Yates - Bass guitar, Guitar, Strings, Keyboards, Vocals, Vibraphone

=== Album personnel ===
- Paul Anderson - Liner Notes
- Martin Bisi - Producer, Engineer
- Mario Casilio - Producer
- Evan Cohen - Executive Producer
- Phil Ek - Producer
- Robin Evans - Producer, Mixing
- Giles Hall - Programming, Producer
- Tim Holmes - Engineer, Mixing
- Jem - String Arrangements
- Gareth Parton - Producer
- Tristan Powell - Producer
- Dave Schultz - Mastering
- Kevin Suggs - Producer
