= Simon Grigg =

New Zealand music businessman (born 1955)

- Born: 1955 (age 70–71); Auckland, New Zealand
- Occupations: Music businessman, writer, producer, musician

Simon Grigg (born 1955) is a New Zealand music businessman, writer, broadcaster, publisher, producer, DJ and archivist. Born in Auckland, New Zealand, he attended Palmerston North Boys High, Auckland Grammar and the University of Auckland.

== Punk rock ==
As a teenager in the 1970s Grigg formed the Suburban Reptiles, one of New Zealand's first two punk rock bands, the other being The Scavengers. With both bands on the bill, In June 1977 he co-promoted New Zealand's first major punk concert, which was the impetus behind a large number of so-called "second generation" punk bands.

== Propeller Records ==
In 1980 he formed the independent record label Propeller Records. Between June 1980 and August 1983 Propeller had a string of influential releases and hit singles and albums, including a number one with The Screaming Meemees, also managed by Grigg.

A second label, Furtive Records, was formed in 1981 to release the debut by Tall Dwarfs and The Newmatics.

In 1982 he was awarded the Record Industry Association Award for Outstanding Contribution to the New Zealand Recording Industry.

The label was seen as ground breaking, and inspired an explosion of independent labels in New Zealand.

== Late 1980s and 1990s ==
In 1986 Grigg opened the first house music nightclub in Australasia, The Asylum in Mt Eden.

A new label, Stimulant, in the mid-1980s had enormous success with UK dance artist Princess and licensed recordings from US labels.

His Def Jam collection Its The New Style was released globally.

The Auckland clubs Box and Cause Celebre, co-owned by Grigg, were important venues and focal points in the Auckland live and dance music scenes from 1988 to 1997.

In 1994 Grigg launched the record label, Huh!, releasing debuts by Nathan Haines and OMC. The latter's "How Bizarre" was a worldwide hit over 1996 and 1997, reaching number one in 15 countries. It remains one of the most successful records released from New Zealand, selling several million copies.

In 1999 Huh launched the first of the Nice 'n' Urlich series, co-ordinated and co-compiled by Grigg, which went multi-platinum across three volumes.

== 2000s ==
Grigg hosted the BPM and Extended Play radio programmes on 95bFM and George FM between 1985 and 2005. The BPM show was New Zealand's first dedicated dancefloor-aimed radio show and ran for 17 years.

In 2004 Grigg's new label, Joy, released "Its On" by 3 The Hard Way, which reached number one in New Zealand.

Propeller Records has also released a series of archival albums, which have documented parts of New Zealand's musical history, including the reissue of the iconic punk collection, AK79, much expanded (a joint release with Flying Nun Records); the New Zealand post punk collection, Bigger Than Both of Us, and the soundtrack to the TVNZ documentary series, Give It A Whirl. The label purchased the catalogue of Bryan Staff's Ripper Records in 2014, thus bringing much of the New Zealand punk catalogue under one roof. AK79 was reissued in December 2019 (CD) and January 2020 (vinyl) with the latter being the first official vinyl issue since 1982 and the first vinyl issue of the extended 1994 tracklisting.

Grigg remains active in the New Zealand recording industry on a consultancy level and as a commentator.

In 2012 Grigg was appointed Creative Director of AudioCulture, the NZ on Air funded online history of the music and musical cultures of New Zealand, which launched on 31 May 2013. Conceived by Grigg, the site's design concept, content direction and curation were his, although it exists under the administrative umbrella of the NZ On Screen trust. AudioCulture was first conceived in the late 2000s and Grigg actively sought funding, supported by the wider New Zealand music industry and in particular Recorded Music New Zealand. After several knockbacks, finally in mid-2012 New Zealand On Air agreed to fund the site. It launched in May 2013.

Grigg resigned as Creative Director in September 2016, although he retains a role as Founding Director.

Simon Grigg's first book How Bizarre: Pauly Fuemana and the song that stormed the world was published in August 2015.

In April 2016 Grigg purchased New Zealand music publication Rip It Up including its archives. In May 2019, the first eight years of this magazine were made available online free at the Papers Past site of the National Library of New Zealand.

In October 2015 he was presented a prestigious Scroll of Honour from the Variety Artists Club of New Zealand.
