= Rialto Channel =

Television channel in New Zealand

Rialto
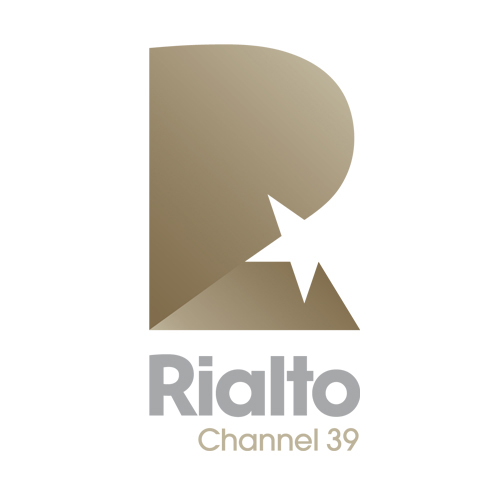
- Country: New Zealand

Programming
- Picture format: 1080i (HDTV) 16:9

History
- Launched: November 2002

Links
- Website: www.rialtochannel.co.nz

Rialto, is a commercial television channel in New Zealand. It began broadcasting in November 2002 on Sky Network Television, who is its part-owner. Rialto developed from the Sundance Channel, owned by David Ross, entertainment entrepreneur John Barnett, businessman Wayne Brown and Peter Francis.

In 2002, the latter three sold shares to Hawken, who has since owned the channel 50:50 with Ross. Sky is not involved with the overseas expansion.

The channel screens films, documentaries and general entertainment programming. The channel has at times sponsored the New Zealand Film Awards.
