= Eternity (2013 film) =

- Directed by: Alex Galvin
- Written by: Alex Galvin
- Produced by: Eric Stark
- Starring: Elliot Travers; Amy Tsang; Liz Kirkman; Dean Knowsley; Rachel Clentworth; Amy Usherwood; Ralph Johnson; Geraldine Brophy
- Cinematography: Matthew Sharp
- Edited by: Nick Swinglehurst; Patrick Canam
- Music by: Michelle Scullion
- Release dates: 10 February 2013 (Boston Science Fiction Film Festival); 28 March 2013 (New Zealand)
- Running time: 78 minutes
- Country: New Zealand
- Language: English
- Budget: $NZ100,000

Eternity is a 2013 sci-fi murder mystery set in the near future. It was directed by Alex Galvin and filmed in Wellington, Hong Kong and Hawke's Bay. The film cost about $NZ100,000 to make but has the production values of a large-budget feature.

== Plot ==
Detective Richard Manning is investigating the most difficult case of his career – the apparently impossible locked room murder of a rich property owner. The case is set to be released in the near future. The more Richard looks into the matter, the more complicated the situation seems to get. He immediately understands that his own future and safety are dependent on his ability to resolve everything – and swiftly.

== Influences and cinematography ==
The film is influenced by Galvin's interest in classic murder mysteries and also many sci-fi films, such as Soylent Green and The Matrix.

In the film, the Wellington scenes utilise local buildings and interiors such as the Town Hall, Parliamentary Library and the art deco Dominion Museum (now the Wellington campus of Massey University) along with Napier and Hastings art deco buildings.

== Cast and crew ==
The film was directed by Alex Galvin (b. 1975 in Christchurch, New Zealand). This is his second feature film. His first was "When Night Falls" in 2007. He received his secondary education at St Patrick's College, Wellington and attended Victoria University of Wellington. He graduated Bachelor of Arts in linguistics and music history. He trained as an opera singer and has been a member of the Chapman Tripp Opera Chorus since 1998. After working as a public servant, Galvin commenced study at the New Zealand Film School in 2003.

Apart from Elliot Travers, the film's actors also include Amy Tsang, and Dean Knowsley.

== Critical reception ==
The film has screened at several film festivals and won several awards. It had its world premiere at the St Tropez Film Festival in October 2012 and its New Zealand premiere at the Hastings Opera House in November 2012. In 2013, Eternity won the Special Jury Prize at the California Film Awards.

The film was selected for screening at Cinema des Antipodes at the Cannes Film Festival in May 2013. and was the only New Zealand Film to screen at the Shanghai International Film Festival in June 2013. In July 2013, it was nominated for four awards at the 2013 Madrid International Film Festival and won two prizes: Best Editing of a Feature Film and Best Supporting Actor for Ralph Johnson.
