= Antarctica: A Year on Ice =

2013 film

- Theatrical release poster
- Directed by: Anthony B. Powell
- Release date: 21 July 2013 (NZIFF)
- Country: New Zealand
- Language: English

Antarctica: A Year on Ice is the first feature film by New Zealand filmmaker Anthony B. Powell. This documentary is set in Antarctica, specifically in the Ross Island region, which is home to two research bases: United States' McMurdo Station and New Zealand's Scott Base.

It chronicles a year of time spent living and working at these remote stations; the summer season (October to February) when the sun shines 24 hours a day and the long dark winter (February to October) where the sun goes down for four long months and darkness envelopes the environment. The film focuses on the everyday workers that keep the stations and the equipment running so the scientists can complete their work. Interviewees include a helicopter pilot, fireman, firehouse dispatcher, cook, mechanic, storekeeper, storeman, finance person, administrative person, and operations manager.

Extensive use of time-lapse photography is used to document the changing seasons and the Antarctic landscapes. Powell had to invent many of his own camera systems to survive the extreme conditions of the deep Antarctic winter.

Powell's previous work includes footage for Discovery, National Geographic, and was featured in BBC's Frozen Planet.

The film also touches upon topics such as T3 Syndrome, which is when the T3 hormone in the brain is reassigned to the muscles of the body in an effort to protect it against the extreme cold. The film also describes how the community works and plays together including the annual New Year's party "Ice Stock".

The film's post-production was completed at Park Road Post Production in Wellington, New Zealand.

The film premiered at the 2013 New Zealand International Film Festival.

== Accolades ==
- Winner: Best Documentary and People's Choice. Calgary International Film Festival.
- Winner: Discovery Award Best First Film (Documentary Category) and People's Choice. Calgary International Film Festival.
- Winner: Best Film and People's Choice. Scottsdale International Film Festival. http://www.stuff.co.nz/taranaki-daily-news/entertainment/9336156/Accolades-flow-for-film-maker
