= Hollie Fullbrook =

New Zealand singer

- Born: 1985 (age 40–41)
- Genre: Indie rock
- Occupations: Musician, songwriter
- Instruments: Vocals, guitar, cello

Hollie Fullbrook is an Auckland-based singer and multi-instrumentalist who is the face of Tiny Ruins. She collaborated with Hamish Kilgour on the Hurtling Through EP.

== Background ==
Fullbrook was born in 1985 and is originally from Bristol, England. She migrated to New Zealand with her family at the age of 10.

== Career ==
In later years, she performed under the alias of Tiny Ruins which later expanded to become a full band. She collaborated with Hamish Kilgour and the result of their efforts was the Hurtling Through EP which was released in 2015.

In 2016, Fullbrook teamed up with Kilgour and former Terrorways and Gary Havoc & The Hurricanes drummer Gary Hunt for a live rendition of the songs from the Hurtling Through release.

== Recordings ==
- For Tiny Ruins recordings see Tiny Ruins discography

=== Appearances ===
- Carnivorous Plant Society - Carnivorous Plant Society - (no label) - (2014) - Vocals on "Would You Rather" and cello on "A.D.N.D."
- Calexico – Edge Of The Sun - City Slang Slang 50072DLP - (2015) - Vocals on "Let It Slip Away"
- Street Chant – Hauora - Arch Hill Recordings – AHR061, Flying Nun Records – FNLP557 - (2016) - Cello on "My Country"
