= The Spelling Mistakes =

New Zealand punk band

- Origin: Auckland, New Zealand
- Genres: Punk
- Years active: 1979–1980
- Labels: Ripper Records; Propeller Records; Sing Sing Records
- Past members: Nick Hanson (vocals); Julian Hanson (drums); Warwick Fowler (guitar); Keith Bacon (bass); Nigel Russell (bass)

The Spelling Mistakes were a New Zealand punk band which had minor success in the local scene in 1979 and 1980.

== History ==
Formed in 1979 from the remnants of two bands, Get Smart and the Aliens, their line-up was Nick Hanson (vocals), Julian Hanson (drums), and Warwick Fowler (guitar). Initial bassist, Keith Bacon, was replaced early in 1980 by Nigel Russell.

Their first recording was "Reena", which featured on one side of a single (with the Whizz Kids) on Ripper Records in early 1980.

After winning a band talent quest, organised by their manager, they signed to Simon Grigg's Propeller Records label, and released the single "Feels So Good" in June 1980. This peaked at No. 29. A second single was recorded but remained unreleased for two decades as the band split in September 1980 after finding it increasingly difficult to find bookings because of the nature of their under-age following.

== Legacy ==
They reformed briefly in 1999 but parted ways later that year. In 2004, "Feels So Good" was re-recorded and featured on an Export Gold advert.

A complete, semi-official, collection of available recordings was released in 2002 as a 2-disc set under the name The Spelling Mistakes: Epileptic Apocalypse 1979–1999. It was nominated for 'best rock release' by bNet NZ Music Awards in 2003.

"Feels So Good" was reissued as a 7" single in June 2012 by New York label, Sing Sing Records.
