= White Lies (2013 film) =

2013 New Zealand film

- Tuakiri Huna
- Directed by: Dana Rotberg
- Screenplay by: Dana Rotberg
- Based on: Medicine Woman by Witi Ihimaera
- Produced by: John Barnett; Chris Hampson
- Starring: Whirimako Black; Rachel House; Antonia Prebble
- Cinematography: Alun Bollinger
- Edited by: Paul Sutorius
- Music by: John Psathas
- Production company: South Pacific Pictures
- Distributed by: Madman Entertainment
- Release date: 27 June 2013
- Running time: 93 minutes
- Country: New Zealand
- Languages: Māori; English
- Box office: $2,760

White Lies - Tuakiri Huna is a 2013 New Zealand film directed by Dana Rotberg and stars Whirimako Black, Antonia Prebble, and Rachel House. It is based on the novella Medicine Woman by Witi Ihimaera. Regarded as an excellent portrayal of colonial oppression in New Zealand, the film deals with the impacts of the Tohunga Suppression Act upon Māori traditions surrounding childbirth.

The story is about a medicine woman Paraiti, who is approached by Maraea, the servant of wealthy woman, Rebecca Vickers, to perform an abortion. Unbeknownst to Paraiti, Maraea has hidden plans. The unborn baby becomes the central figure in the story, as the women are forced to reconcile their differing perspectives and confront their own expectations of motherhood, life and death.

The film premiered in New Zealand cinemas on 27 June 2013. It screened in the Contemporary World Cinema section at the 2013 Toronto International Film Festival. The film was selected as the New Zealand entry for the Best Foreign Language Film at the 86th Academy Awards.

== Plot ==
As a young girl Paraiti, witnesses the brutal killing of her family by European settlers in a conflict that leaves a permanent scar on her cheek. Many years later, Paraiti, lives a semi-nomadic existence in the rural Te Urewera region of New Zealand, and is working underground as a medicine woman and healer. In 1907, the New Zealand government passed the Tohunga Suppression Act to outlaw natural healing for Māori. Forbidden from practicing her traditional healing arts and using native medicine under the act, Paraiti endeavours to care for her people in strict secrecy. It is later revealed that Paraiti trains pregnant young women in birthing procedures and secretly uses a variety of herbs and plants to apply ancient healing methods to her patients.

On a rare visit to town, Paraiti is approached by Maraea, the Māori housekeeper of a wealthy white woman named Rebecca Vickers (Antonia Prebble). Rebecca is pregnant and seeks to terminate the pregnancy before her wealthy husband, a businessman, returns from an extended absence in Europe. Paraiti would be paid handsomely for her services and discretion, provided she could perform the abortion in less than a week's time. Initially, Paraiti refuses to help, but changes her mind when a young Māori girl and her unborn baby die at the hands of a white nurse. The scene has been described as a harrowing turning point for Paraiti, as she is forced to retrieve the whenua (placenta) of the stillborn child from a rusted garbage can in order to return it to her land and people. Paraiti decides to help Rebecca as her way of “restoring some justice”, although it is unclear exactly what she means.

Mrs Vickers is an "imperious snob" who shows obvious disdain towards Paraiti and her “ancient ways.” Maraea proves an even greater adversary, refusing to speak to Paraiti in their native language and speaking down to her. Nevertheless, Paraiti remains stoic. As the week progresses, Paraiti begins to uncover hidden secrets within the house, while revealing her own plan for justice. The pivotal turning point occurs when it is revealed that Maraea is Rebecca's mother and has been bleaching her skin daily since childhood to ensure her survival in a white world. The birth of the baby would reveal her true identity to her husband and to society.

Rebecca gives birth on the clay floor of the cellar under the house, surrounded by Paraiti and Maraea.

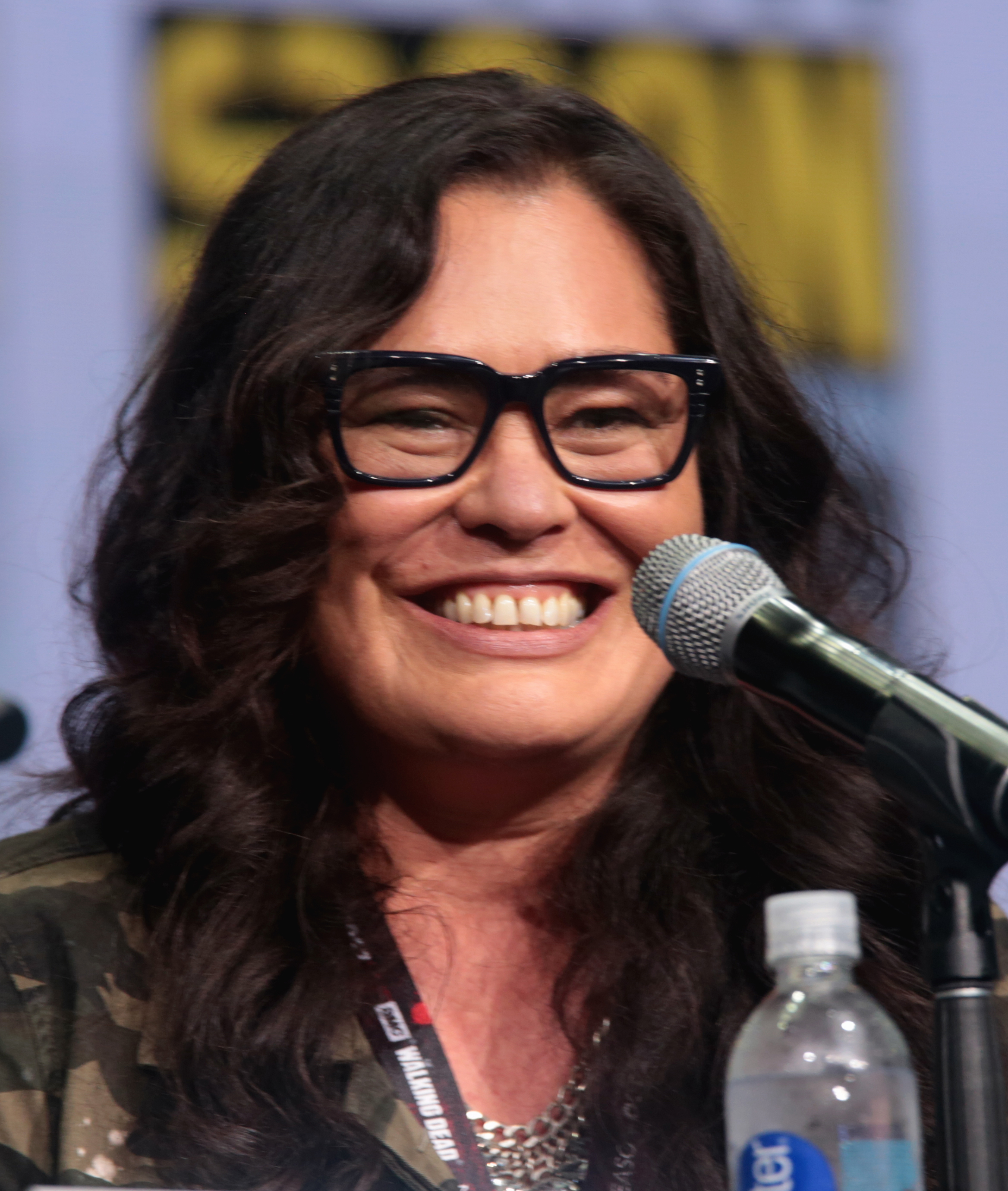
Rachel House speaking at the 2017 San Diego Comic-Con

== Cast ==
- Whirimako Black as Paraiti
- Rachel House as Maraea
- Antonia Prebble as Rebecca
- Nancy Brunning as Horiana
- Te Waimarie Kessell as Aroha
- Kohuorangi Ta Whara as Wirepa
- Elizabeth Hawthorne as Hospital Matron
- Te Ahurei Rakuraku as young Paraiti
- Tahuri o te Rangi Trainor Tait as Paraiti's Grandfather
- Kyle Pryor as Soldier
- Rawiri Waiariki as Horiana's Grandchild
- Te Whenua Te Kurapa as Pirimahana
- Tangiroa Tawhara as Woman with Bad Leg
- Vanessa Paraki as Limping Girl
- Phil Peleton as Chemist
- Deizhon Manuanui King as the baby

== Screenplay and adaptation ==
In the extras of the DVD, Witi Ihimaera tells how his mother took him to Paraiti, a tohunga/healer who cured him of a breathing problem. In writing the story, he wanted to honour the various tohunga in Māori life.

The screenplay for the film was adapted from Witi Ihimaera's 2007 novella 'Medicine Woman', found in the collection Ask The Posts of the House. The screenwriter and director of the film, Dana Rotberg, has described the novella as "a perfect piece of storytelling", which "contained complexity, was generous in its understanding of human drama and had a delightful sense of humour." Describing her inspiration to adapt the novella, Rotberg has stated: "The story would not leave my mind. It kept visiting me while I was driving on the motorway, when falling asleep, while cooking … Paraiti, the medicine woman, was a stubborn presence who refused to leave and I became haunted by her."

Throughout the process of adaptation, Rotberg was careful to respect and honour the Māori story at the centre of the narrative. Born and raised in Mexico, Rotberg moved to New Zealand in 2002 after watching Whale Rider, a film also based on a story by Ihimaera. Rotberg worked closely with cultural advisors Kararaina Rangihau, Tangiora Tawhara and Whitiaua Ropitini, and claimed that the advisors formed an "integral part" of the scriptwriting and production process, and that “[e]very word was approved." She also read prodigiously about Tuhoe and spent time in Te Urewera in preparation for the film.

The film has been commended as a "sincere, heartfelt attempt to enter into and convey a Maori story told through Maori eyes" that is "doubly commendable because it is written and directed by a film-maker who was born, and learned her craft, in Mexico."

Rotberg has stated that she felt “privileged” to be “guided by people who know the Māori culture from deep within." She has stated:

“…I would never have shot anything if I had not have had the approval, the blessing and the participation of the people who were hosting us – culturally, logistically and in terms of location. I worked with these people for a number of years before the final script was brought to production.”

Rotberg has also spoken of a deep personal connection with Ihimaera's novella, and has stated that the story spoke to her in a way that transcended boundaries of race and culture. While careful to adapt the script with cultural integrity, Rotberg felt compelled to infuse the story with her own identity "as a filmmaker and as a human being."

“I felt [there] was a clear sign that the story told by Witi Ihimaera was speaking to me from places other than where the original work had come from. Places that belonged to my intimate family history and my most unresolved conflicts as a person in the world. It was a call from the core of my origins to look for answers that mattered to me, being myself a half-caste, a woman, a mother and a descendant of people who have been eternal immigrants or brutally colonised by others. A call coming from every drop of the Mexican, Jewish, Catholic, Polish, indigenous, Italian, Spanish and Russian blood that runs through my veins. The blood of my tipuna. My very own whakapapa.”

Embarking on the process of adaptation, Rotberg asked Ihimaera for "freedom and independence from him an author" to transform Medicine Woman into the final screenplay for White Lies - Tuakiri Huna. She made several marked changes to the novella's original storyline. In the original novella, Maraea is subject to Rebecca's wishes. In the film, however, Maraea is conceived as the "puppet-master" of the story, pulling strings and controlling the actions of the other female protagonists. Importantly, in the film, Paraiti decides to save the unborn child prior to finding out its true identity. Rotberg believed this to be of great importance, claiming it would illustrate a greater storyline of humanity and redemption.

== Themes and analysis ==
Motherhood

Motherhood is, according to Rotberg, the central dramatic element "that ignites and fuels the narrative of this film." The film centres upon Rebecca's pregnancy, which serves as a narrative tool to ensure that the three main characters confront their irreconcilable beliefs regarding motherhood, destiny and death. The challenges and decisions that each of the main characters make in relation to the pregnancy contribute to their journey of self-identity, even when such a journey points to a “tragic destiny.” The three female protagonists each have a different view of the pregnancy at the film's inception - Rebecca Vickers is susceptible to her mother's wishes, and Maraea believes that revealing the true identity of the child will have life-changing consequences for her daughter. This becomes the central irony of the film, as Maraea imposes her beliefs upon Rebecca believing it is her own motherly duty to protect her, however ultimately prevents Rebecca from experiencing motherhood herself. The relationship dynamic between the two characters departs significantly from Ihimaera's original novella, in which Rebecca gives birth and attempts to murder her child, and Maraea tries to stop her.

It has been suggested that the theme of motherhood can also be seen as a vehicle through which the themes of identity, colonialism and reclamation are explored, as each theme is explored through the eyes of the female protagonists. Early in the film, Paraiti is witness to the death of a young Māori mother, Aroha, and her unborn baby. Paraiti is left powerless as the matron in charge threatens to send her to jail for possession of medicinal herbs, leaving her to witness the unspeakable tragedy. Paraiti is also unable to save the whenua (placenta) of the unborn baby to return it to her ancient lands and people. In Māori culture, the whenua is often returned to the earth and buried in a place of significance or on tribal lands. It has been suggested that the burial of the whenua can help to "establish a sense of ‘home’ or ‘belonging’ for a child." It has also been suggested that the practice serves to “merge the land… ancestresses and female goddesses, with mother and baby.” The scene shows the matron in charge tossing the placenta onto a rubbish heap, forcing Paraiti to retrieve it from a rusted tin garbage can. The scene can be viewed as a turning point for Paraiti's character, as she experiences firsthand the violation of her traditional knowledges and practices. In being unable to save the whenua, Paraiti must confront the “undeniable reality that her world, the universe of her ancestors and the very possibility of continuity of her culture, is crumbling under the power of the imposition of a new and foreign law.”

It has also been suggested that the traditional practice of burying the whenua carries significance in the broader context of land rights in New Zealand, as it illustrates the deep connection that is established with the land and reinforces responsibility and stewardship. In Māori cosmology, the word whenua has a double meaning, meaning both placenta and land. It has been suggested that there are numerous examples of words and concepts in Māori culture that carry double meanings and "illustrate the importance of reproduction, birth and mothering to the survival, strength and vibrancy of Māori communities." For Rotberg, motherhood is the “primal and universal symbol of identity, continuity and life." The symbol of motherhood within the film is, according to her:

"not only a symbol of how the fabric of contemporary New Zealand was woven, but also a fable of hope in a world still not aware of the very simple truth that the choice of creation over destruction, tolerance instead of suppression, is the only possible way."

The theme of motherhood is also central to the visual geography of the film. In particular, it has been suggested that Paraiti is conceived as an archetypal Mexican goddess, who serves “to fortify the primal connection of mother and child, and of people with their land.”

=== Language ===
Rotberg based the title of the film off of a popular Mexican saying: ‘Verdades a medias: mentiras que matan’, which roughly translates to ‘Half-truths are lies that kill.’ Rotberg has stated that she believed the phrase ‘White Lies’ conveyed "precisely" the meaning of the saying in the historical context of colonisation. The title takes on a double meaning within the film: the traditional and the literal. Rotberg believed that once these two meanings collide, the double meaning behind the title foreshadows the importance of language, reclamation and identity within the story.

The film features dialogue both in English and in the language of te reo Māori of the Tuhoe people of Ruatahuna. In te reo Māori, Tuakiri Huna means:

“Tua: Beyond, on the other side of. Kiri: skin. Tuakiri, which combines both words, becomes: Identity, personality. Huna: To conceal or hide.”

The juxtaposition of these two languages in the film's dialogue becomes a clear and powerful expression of the clash between two different worlds and two foreign cosmologies. In particular, Rotberg wanted to ensure that language could be used as a tool to celebrate and assert Paraiti's identity throughout the film, as she speaks te reo Māori to Maraea, in spite of her refusal to reply in their native language. This use of language can also be seen as both a symbol of oppression and one of reclamation, as Paraiti continues to remind Marea that "no matter how properly she speaks English, she is and always will be a Māori woman." According to Rotberg, the centrality of the te reo Māori language allowed "every word [to acquire] new and rich connotations... the translators... took the dialogue to a place way beyond the functional purpose of naming, describing and communicating. They provided this film with a poetic cosmogony, music with multiple meanings and the organic, living expression of a profound, ancient, complex and holistic culture.”

It has also been noted that much of Ihimaera's fictional work also emphasises the importance of the Māori language, using Māori terms throughout his work instead of their English equivalents and refusing to publish glossaries. In speaking of the importance of this choice, Ihimaera has stated:

"First of all I write for Maori, and for me not to acknowledge that would be entirely wrong. My second target audience is the rest, the non-Maori and international audience...They are not a priority for me. They're a bonus more than anything. Politically and as a Maori, I draw the line at my valley."

In this way, both the film and Ihimaera's original fictional work have strong ties to language, identity and reclamation.

== Reception ==
The New York Times has described the film as a "quiet tale of cultural oppression" that is "infused with slow tension." In addition, Webster praises the leading female actresses for their formidable performances, describing them as "well-matched opponents" and highlighting the strength of Black's debut on-screen performance. Black's performance was met with positive reception amongst film critics, with one review stating that Black's “earthy intensity centres the drama with a commanding stillness.”

The New Zealand Herald has commended the film's female-driven storyline, noting the absence of any significant male characters. It has been noted that the film passes the Bechdel Test, which is used as a measure of female representation in fiction requiring multiple female protagonists whose lives, conversations and actions do not revolve around men. It has also been suggested that the female-driven storyline is reflective of Rotberg's broader work in the feminist film tradition.

A review in Film Journal International applauds the film for its well-meaning attempts to address issues of colonialism and cultural identity, but states that the film suffers from heavy-handedness in its delivery. It has also been suggested that the English-language portions of the dialogue feel stiff and stagnant, and detract from the otherwise natural feel of the film. In addition, a few critics noted the film's obvious plot reveal, which audiences would have guessed “an hour into the film.” One critic also suggested that the use of symbolism within the film lacked nuance.

The natural beauty of the film has been noted by critics. The film's setting has been described as “indescribably beautiful” and well-captured by the film's cinematographer, Alun Bollinger, who has worked on several films with Peter Jackson, including the second Lord of the Rings film. The depictions of Ruatahuna on New Zealand's north island were particularly well received by critics.

The Hollywood Reporter also commended John Psathas’ "delicate" use of traditional Māori instruments to score the film.

On Rotten Tomatoes the film has an approval rating of 100% based on reviews from 6 critics, with an average rating of 7.5/10.

== Accolades ==
Asia Pacific Screen Awards 2013
	Award	Recipient
Nominee	Best Performance by an Actress	Whirimako Black

New Zealand Film and TV Awards (II) 2013
	Award	Recipient
Winner	Best Makeup Design	Abby Collins; Yolander Bartham; Vee Gulliver; Andrew Beattle; Main Reactor; Roger Murray
Winner	Best Production Design	Tracey Collins
Nominee	Best Actress	Whirimako Black
Nominee	Best Supporting Actress	Antonia Prebble
Nominee	Best Screenplay	Dana Rotberg
Nominee	Best Cinematography	Alun Bollinger
Nominee	Best Editor	Paul Sutorius
Nominee	Best Score	John Psathas
Nominee	Best Sound	Steve Finnigan; James Hayday; Chris Sinclair
Nominee	Best Costume Design	Tracey Collins

The WIFTs Foundation International Visionary Awards 2013
Status	Award	Recipient
Winner	The Best Director Award	Dana Rotberg

These tables have been sourced from IMDb.

== See also ==
- List of submissions to the 86th Academy Awards for Best Foreign Language Film
- List of New Zealand submissions for the Academy Award for Best Foreign Language Film
