= The Scavengers =

New Zealand rock band

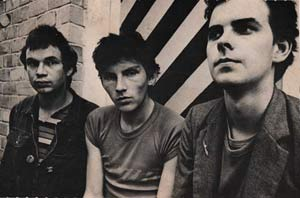
- From left: Cooke, Perry, Monroe

Background information
- Also known as: The Marching Girls
- Origin: Auckland, New Zealand
- Genres: Punk rock
- Years active: 1976–80
- Past members: Ken Cooke (Johnny Volume); Simon Monroe (Des Truction); Brendan Perry (Ronnie Recent); Mike Simons (Mike Lezbian); Marlon Hart (Mal Icious)

The Scavengers were a New Zealand-Australian punk rock band that formed in 1976. They moved to Melbourne, Australia, in November 1978 and became Marching Girls.

== History ==
The band was formed in 1976 at Auckland Technical Institute by graphic design students Ken Cooke, Simon Monroe, Mike Simons and Marlon Hart, under the name The 1B Darlings. They were heavily influenced by British R&B, glam rock and 1960s US garage rock. In 1977, they renamed themselves the Scavengers and gave themselves punk stage names (Cooke as Johnny Volume, Monroe as Des Truction, Simons as Mike Lezbian and Hart as Mal Icious). Their style mutated in the direction of the US punk rock and proto-punk acts.

Through much of 1977, they and Suburban Reptiles were the only punk bands in Auckland. In June 1977 they, along with Suburban Reptiles and the Masochists, played New Zealand's first major punk gig, at the University of Auckland. Their repertoire during this time was mostly covers, but by early 1978, they had written a set of original tunes. In late 1977, bassist Hart left to be replaced by Brendan Perry, who performed under the stage name "Ronnie Recent". In March 1978, they began a residency at Zwines, a new Auckland punk club. Simons soon left (inspiring their signature song "Mysterex"), and Perry moved to vocals.

Two Scavengers tracks appeared on the Ripper compilation AK79, and a retrospective album was released in 2003.

== The Marching Girls ==
The Scavengers moved to Sydney, then Melbourne, Australia, in November 1978, and renamed themselves Marching Girls, issuing some recordings and video clips.

== Legacy ==
Perry later formed Dead Can Dance, and Monroe (a.k.a. Des Hefner) played briefly for the Birthday Party during the latter band's final tour of Australia and New Zealand. Monroe went on to play in a series of Melbourne-based acts including the Slaughtermen, Maurice Frawley and SPIROS. Both Cooke (Go Public and Daisy West) and Monroe are still working musicians in Melbourne.

The Scavengers were hugely influential in Auckland in the late 1970s, inspiring a whole generation of young bands. They re-formed in 2004 for a one-off show in Auckland without Perry, and again at the AK79 reunion in 2008.

The rockabilly/punk band Scavengers of Brighton, England, has no connection to the New Zealand band.

== Discography ==
| Date of Release | Title | Label | Charted | Country | Catalog Number |
|---|---|---|---|---|---|
| 2003 | The Scavengers | Zerox | – | New Zealand | DZEROX 01 |
