= Propeller Records =

New Zealand independent record label

Propeller Records was an independent record label formed in Auckland, New Zealand, by Simon Grigg in 1980.

== 1980-81 ==
In the years prior to 1980 the New Zealand contemporary recording industry was largely moribund. The major record labels were either not recording or were confining themselves largely to middle of the road acts. The independent labels that existed either recorded Polynesian and Māori music or were offshoots of recording studios, releasing the odd record as a by product of down time in the studio. The thriving independent scene of the early seventies had largely wound down, and the large and vibrant live music scene was not being represented on vinyl.

The only exception to this was WEA, under the guidance of Tim Murdoch, who had released a number of recordings including that of Toy Love, at that time, the biggest live act in New Zealand, and Ripper, owned by Bryan Staff, which had released a couple of singles and was about to issue the enormously influential AK79 collection, which documented the New Zealand punk scene of the late seventies. However Ripper was documenting a past scene rather than signing and releasing the raft of acts filling the pubs and halls around Auckland and the rest of the country.

Grigg, with a history in the Auckland punk scene, and having recently returned from a sojourn in Australia, was inspired by the young indie scene in that country, by the rise of the British independent record labels (Stiff, Rough Trade, Small Wonder and the like) and WEA’s success with Toy Love, to form a record label.

With a $400 loan from the girlfriend of a band member he released two singles in June 1980, distributing both himself by hand and mail. Both, by The Features and The Spelling Mistakes, sold out their initial pressings immediately and entered the New Zealand singles chart, causing quite a stir.

The next few months saw Propeller release a steady stream of singles, most of which charted. At the end of 1980, faced with the reality of self distribution, Grigg signed a deal to distribute in Australasia with Festival Records, a deal which gave Propeller the first NZ label to have its own label identity across the Tasman.

The initial result of this deal was the Class of 81 compilation, a collection of young acts from (mostly) Auckland, which defined the city’s scene over the next few years.

Propeller signed three of these acts immediately, Blam Blam Blam, The Screaming Meemees, and The Newmatics. The latter act were signed to a new offshoot label, Furtive, distributed via CBS and managed by Paul Rose, whom Grigg had bought in as a partner.

The following months saw releases by all these acts, plus, on Furtive, the debut release by ex-Toy Love members Chris Knox and Alec Bathgate, as The Tall Dwarfs. All charted and at one time in mid 1981 Propeller had 4 singles in the top 40, including the number one (with The Screaming Meemees’ See Me Go).

In July and August 1981 Propeller celebrated this success with a nationwide package tour featuring three of its acts, The Screaming Blamatic Roadshow, which swept through Universities and cities to capacity houses everywhere, culminating with three sold out nights at Auckland’s Mainstreet Cabaret, playing to some 30,000 people across the country.

The label also signed a license deal with Melbourne’s Missing Link label to release in New Zealand, two albums by The Birthday Party.

== 1982-83 ==
Propeller then embarked on album projects for two of its acts, Blam Blam Blam and The Screaming Meemees, which were to prove its undoing. Whilst the label continued to sign and release acts which charted (including No Tag, The Skeptics, The Dabs, The Bongos and others), massive cost overruns on these album projects proved insurmountable, despite their success in chart and sales terms, and the labels ceased functioning in mid 1983 with Grigg relocating to London for several years before returning to run, firstly the Stimulant and then, huh!, labels, and launching a series of influential clubs.

Propeller had a short but highly influential life. In its wake came a raft of independent labels, including the important Flying Nun label and in it may be seen the germ of the now thriving New Zealand music industry.

== After 1983 ==
Propeller has, since 1986, released a series of important historic collections of New Zealand music, including the expanded and remastered AK79 album, Bigger Than Both of Us, a collection of NZ indie singles from the early to mid eighties, and Give It a Whirl, an album to accompany the TVNZ series of the History of NZ popular music of the same name. In 2014 Propeller acquired the catalogue of Bryan Staff's Ripper Records label.

== See also ==
- List of record labels
