= Nature (The Mutton Birds album) =

Compilation album by The Mutton Birds
- Released: September 1995
- Genre: Rock
- Label: Virgin Records
- Producer: Wayne Connolly

The Mutton Birds chronology
Salty (1994)	Nature (1995)	Envy of Angels (1996)

Professional ratings
Review scores
Source	Rating
AllMusic	4.5/5 stars
The Encyclopedia of Popular Music	3/5 stars

Nature is a compilation album by the New Zealand rock band The Mutton Birds. The album, a selection of songs from the band's first two albums, was released in 1995 in the UK.

Another compilation, Box of Birds, a double CD repackaging of the entire two albums, was released in New Zealand two months later with an almost identical cover. Box of Birds spent three weeks in the New Zealand album charts and peaked at No. 42.

== Track listing ==
(All songs by Don McGlashan except where noted)

1. "Nature" (Wayne Mason) — 3:40
2. "Dominion Road" — 3:48
3. "Anchor Me" — 4:30
4. "The Heater" (McGlashan, Alan Gregg, David Long, Ross Burge) — 4:25
5. "Giant Friend" — 3:50
6. "Your Window" — 4:16
7. "White Valiant" — 5:11
8. "In My Room" — 4:34
9. "A Thing Well Made" — 4:38
10. "Queen's English" — 6:27
11. "There's a Limit" (Gregg) — 4:17
12. "Too Close to the Sun" (McGlashan, Long) — 5:35

== Personnel ==
- Don McGlashan – guitars, vocals, euphonium, melodica
- Ross Burge – drums, autoharp
- Alan Gregg – bass guitar, vocals, keyboards
- David Long – guitar, vocals, keyboards, banjo
