= Envy of Angels =

Studio album by the Mutton Birds
- Released: November 1996
- Recorded: Rockfield Studios, Monmouth, Wales
- Genre: Rock
- Length: 62:32
- Label: Virgin
- Producer: Hugh Jones

The Mutton Birds chronology
Nature (1995)	Envy of Angels (1996)	Angle of Entry (1997)

Professional ratings
Review scores
Source	Rating
AllMusic	4.5/5 stars
Sunday Herald Sun	3/5 stars
The Australian	4/5 stars
The Age	3/5 stars
Sydney Morning Herald	5/5 stars

Envy of Angels is the third album by the New Zealand rock band the Mutton Birds. It was first released in New Zealand in 1996.

== Writing ==
McGlashan said that much of the material on the album had been inspired by the move to Britain. "With this record, we'd just left home and your world shrinks a bit as you travel. Instead of being individuals each with a big network of friends back home in New Zealand, we were like four people in a van travelling around Europe. So all the songs came from that more confined world. There are a lot of songs which are less sociable than our previous records." He said moving to the UK was an entirely new experience for the band. "Being away from home and writing material in a foreign place allowed me to write about the memories of our homeland." Tracks such as "Envy of Angels" deals with McGlashan's homesickness. He said, "That song is dedicated to my dad, it's about driving around the suburb I grew up as a teenager, and hearing him talk about the landscape (he's a civil engineer), and me wanting to be somewhere else that had more of a sense of history at the time. It's a song about coming back and driving those same roads now and being able to see things through his eyes. I guess the phrasing of the album is about the way people in love with progress see the physical world as something the angels would love to be a part of."

== Production ==
The album was recorded in Monmouth, Wales, during a year-long stay in the UK and produced by Hugh Jones, whose previous credits had included Echo & the Bunnymen, The Undertones, The Damned and Died Pretty. The songwriter and singer Don McGlashan said, "Hugh's first comments to us were that he really liked the way we arranged things and the way we sounded and he wanted to help us focus in on that rather than help us turn into anything else." He said the album's atmospheric minimalist touches had also emerged from their work with Jones. "I think that's partly just having someone give you the permission to not sweeten everything up, to not use lots of layers of instruments and not over-sell the ideas. That was a really valuable lesson to learn."

The album was the last with the guitarist David Long, who left the band as the Mutton Birds continued working in the UK and Europe. Long was replaced by the London-based New Zealand expatriate Chris Sheehan. "David was the most homesick of all of us and the least in love with the associated paraphernalia of being in a band," McGlashan said.

== Release ==
The album was first released in New Zealand in November 1996, with subsequent releases in Australia in May 1997 and the United Kingdom in June 1997. It was released in some territories with a bonus track of the band's version of Blue Öyster Cult's "Don't Fear the Reaper", which the band had recorded for the soundtrack of the 1996 Peter Jackson horror comedy film The Frighteners. McGlashan said the song had been included after Australia's Triple M radio network placed it on high rotation. He told Sydney's Daily Telegraph, "That was really bizarre. This week we're just learning to play it again so we can do it for Australian audiences who may well know it from Triple M. We've only ever played it twice before, once was in the studio." "Don't Fear the Reaper" peaked at No.48 on the Australian ARIA singles charts, the only Mutton Birds single to chart in Australia.

Several tracks from the sessions at Rockfield Studios in Monmouth were included on the 1997 limited release rarities collection, Too Hard Basket.

== Track listing ==
(All songs by Don McGlashan except where noted)

1. "Straight to Your Head" – 5:52
2. "She's Been Talking" – 3:56
3. "Trouble with You" – 4:29
4. "April" – 2:16
5. "Like This Train" – 4:31
6. "Another Morning" – 3:22
7. "Ten Feet Tall" – 3:41
8. "Come Around" (Alan Gregg) – 3:56
9. "Crooked Mile" (David Long) – 2:07
10. "Along the Boundary" – 4:28
11. "While You Sleep" – 4:34
12. "Inside My Skin" (Long) – 1:42
13. "Envy of Angels" – 5:48

Bonus track

14. "Don't Fear the Reaper" (Buck Dharma) – 4:07

=== Bonus disc ===
A limited edition bonus disc had acoustic performances of seven Mutton Birds songs.

1. "Anchor Me"
2. "The Heater"
3. "In My Room"
4. "April"
5. "Another Morning"
6. "When the Wind Comes Around"
7. "Dominion Road"

== Personnel ==
- Don McGlashan – guitars, vocals, euphonium, melodica
- Ross Burge – drums
- Alan Gregg – bass guitar, vocals, keyboards
- David Long – guitar, vocals, keyboards

=== Additional personnel ===
- Caroline Lavelle – cello ("Envy of Angels")
- Ann Wood – violin ("Straight to Your Head")

== Charts ==
Chart performance for Envy of Angels
Chart (1996–1997)	Peak position
Australian Albums (ARIA)	59
New Zealand Albums (RMNZ)	4
UK Albums (OCC)	64
