= Free Range: The Mutton Birds Live 2012 =

Live album by The Mutton Birds
- Released: 2012
- Recorded: 2012
- Genre: Rock
- Length: 64:00
- Label: RNZ
- Producer: Andre Upston

The Mutton Birds chronology
Flock: The Best of the Mutton Birds (2002)	Free Range: The Mutton Birds Live 2012 (2012)

In early 2012 the original line-up of The Mutton Birds reunited after 10 years for a series of concerts in New Zealand. This album 'Free Range – The Mutton Birds Live 2012' is a record of an intimate show at the King's Arms in Auckland.

== Track listing ==
1. "Envy of Angels" – 6:54
2. "Dominion Road" – 4:29
3. "In My Room" – 4:17
4. "A Thing Well Made" – 5:52
5. "Too Close To The Sun" – 6:39
6. "Come Around" – 3:55
7. "Trouble With You" – 4:42
8. "Queen’s English" – 7:49
9. "The Heater" – 4:13
10. "Along The Boundary" – 4:36
11. "White Valiant" – 5:34
12. "Nature" – 6:38
13. "Anchor Me" – 5:34

== Credits ==
=== Musicians ===
- Don McGlashan – Voice, Guitars, Euphonium
- Ross Burge – Drums
- Alan Gregg – Bass, Voice
- David Long – Lead Guitar

=== Recording ===
- Recorded at "The King's Arms" Auckland, 29 February 2012. Recorded and mixed by Andre Upston of Radio New Zealand.
