= Angle of Entry =

Live album by The Mutton Birds
- Released: 1997
- Recorded: 7 July 1997
- Studio: 12 Bar Club, Denmark Place, London
- Genre: Rock
- Length: 67.26
- Label: Gravy Train Records
- Producer: Yaron Levy, Alex Belmont

The Mutton Birds chronology
Envy of Angels (1996)	Angle of Entry (1997)	Too Hard Basket (1998)

Angle of Entry is a limited-issue live acoustic album recorded by the Mutton Birds during their 1997 Envy of Angels UK tour and released on their managers' label. It was sold at gigs and over the Internet.

The album cover notes said the 12 Bar Club was "the sort of venue for which the word 'intimate' was invented. On a stage barely large enough to swing a cat, on stools perched precariously close to the side of the stage the Mutton Birds belted out a selection of their songs. It was one of those magical nights when the audience would call out the title of a song and the band would play it if it came up next on their set-list."

== Track listing ==
(All tracks by Don McGlashan except where noted)

1. "Envy of Angels" – 6.07
2. "Like This Train" – 4.36
3. "Another Morning" – 3.28
4. "A Thing Well Made" – 5.56
5. "Esther" (Alan Gregg) – 3.35
6. "Trouble with You" – 4.27
7. "There's a Limit" (Gregg) – 4.05
8. "Come Around" (Gregg) – 4.03
9. "Dominion Road" – 4.32
10. "Anchor Me" – 6.59
11. "Ten Feet Tall" – 6.18
12. "While You Sleep" – 4.21
13. "White Valiant" – 5.09
14. "Wellington" (Gregg) – 3.42

== Personnel ==
- Don McGlashan – voice, guitars, euphonium
- Ross Burge – drums
- Alan Gregg – bass guitar, voice
- Chris Sheehan – lead guitar
