= The Remarkables (band) =

New Zealand band

- Origin: Palmerston North, New Zealand
- Years active: 1985-????
- Past members: Alan Gregg; Brendan Conlon; Paul Westbury; Chris Heaphy; Zane Greig

The Remarkables were a 1980s band from Palmerston North, New Zealand. One of the band's members Alan Gregg has gone on to feature in a number of other New Zealand bands including the Mutton Birds and Marshmallow. The other members of the band were Brendan Conlon on drums, Paul Westbury on guitar and vocals, and Chris Heaphy on guitar and vocals.

== Discography ==
title	publisher	year released
Waiting For A Wave	Meltdown Records	1985
Vegetarian / Skin Condintion	Meltdown Records	1986
