= New Zealand top 20 singles of 2006 =

This is a list of the Top 20 singles in 2006 in New Zealand, as listed by the Recording Industry Association of New Zealand (RIANZ).

== Chart ==
Songs in grey shading indicates a song of New Zealand origin.

Key
† – Song of New Zealand origin (Note: Whether or not a song is of New Zealand origin is determined by the RIANZ)

Rank	Artist	Title
1	Gnarls Barkley	"Crazy" from the album, St. Elsewhere
2	Pussycat Dolls featuring will.i.am	"Beep" from the album, PCD
3	Mt Raskil Preservation Society featuring Hollie Smith	"Bathe in the River"† from the No. 2 soundtrack
4	Shakira featuring Wyclef Jean	"Hips Don't Lie" from the album, Oral Fixation, Vol. 2
5	Chris Brown featuring Juelz Santana	"Run It!" from the album, Chris Brown
6	Nelly Furtado featuring Timbaland	"Promiscuous" from the album, Loose
7	Busta Rhymes	"Touch It" from the album, The Big Bang
8	The Pussycat Dolls featuring Snoop Dogg	"Buttons" from the album, PCD
9	Justin Timberlake	"SexyBack" from the album, FutureSex/LoveSounds
10	Chamillionaire featuring Tyree	"Ridin' (New Zealand Remix)"† from the single of the same name
11	T-Pain featuring Mike Jones	"I'm 'n Luv (Wit a Stripper)" from the album, Rappa Ternt Sanga
12	Bob Sinclar featuring Gary Pine	"Love Generation" from the album, Western Dream
13	Aaradhna	"Down Time"† from the album, I Love You
14	Vanessa Hudgens, Zac Efron and Drew Seeley	"Breaking Free" from the High School Musical soundtrack
15	The Black Eyed Peas	"Pump It" from the album, Monkey Business
16	The Pussycat Dolls	"Stickwitu" from the album, PCD
17	Rihanna	"SOS" from the album, A Girl Like Me
18	TV Rock featuring Seany B	"Flaunt It" from the album, Sunshine City
19	Sandi Thom	"I Wish I Was a Punk Rocker (With Flowers in My Hair)" from the album, Smile... It Confuses People
20	Ne-Yo	"So Sick" from the album, In My Own Words
