= Rain, Steam and Speed =

Studio album by the Mutton Birds
- Released: February 1999
- Recorded: July–August 1998
- Studio: Blackwing Studios, London, Metropolis Studios, London
- Genre: Rock
- Length: 50:47
- Label: shhh! Records
- Producer: The Mutton Birds

The Mutton Birds chronology
| Too Hard Basket (1998) | Rain, Steam and Speed (1999) | Live in Manchester (2000) |

Singles from Album
- 1. "Pulled Along by Love" Released: 1999

Professional ratings
Review scores
| Source | Rating |
|---|---|
| Allmusic | 3.5/5 stars |
| The Age | 3/5 stars |
| Sunday Herald Sun | 4/5 stars |
| The Australian | 4/5 stars |
| Sunday Telegraph | 7.5/10 stars |

Rain, Steam and Speed is the fourth and final studio album by the New Zealand band, the Mutton Birds. It was released in 1999.

The album coincided with the departure of the bass guitarist, vocalist and sometime song contributor Alan Gregg, and also the guitarist David Long. It was released as the Mutton Birds remained based in London seeking a breakthrough on the UK market.

== Track listing ==
(All songs by Don McGlashan)

1. "As Close as This" — 4:21
2. "Winning Numbers" — 3:46
3. "Small Mercies" — 4:37
4. "Green Lantern" — 4:02
5. "The Falls" — 5:05
6. "Last Year's Shoes" — 4:27
7. "Jackie's Song" — 3:43
8. "Pulled Along by Love" — 4:30
9. "Goodbye Drug" — 6:19
10. "Hands Full" — 3:28
11. "Ray" — 6:24

== Personnel ==
- Don McGlashan – vocals, acoustic guitars, EBow guitar, piano, organ, euphonium
- Ross Burge – drums, tambourine
- Alan Gregg – bass guitar
- Chris Sheehan – bass guitar, electric guitar

=== Additional personnel ===
- Tony Fisher — backing vocals
- David Mitchell — Ebow guitar
- Stuart Nesbit — pedal steel
- Tony Kiley — congas
