= The Mutton Birds (album) =

Mutton Birds

Studio album by The Mutton Birds
- Released: 1992
- Recorded: 1992
- Genre: Rock
- Length: 41.33
- Label: Bag Records
- Producer: The Mutton Birds

The Mutton Birds chronology
Mutton Birds (1992)	Salty (1993)

The Mutton Birds is the first album by the New Zealand band The Mutton Birds. Released in 1992, it remained on the New Zealand album charts for more than a year and was named Best Album at the 1993 New Zealand Music Awards. It was among the records selected by the author Nick Bollinger for his 2009 book, 100 Essential New Zealand albums.

A single, a version of "Nature", the 1968 song by the Fourmyula, reached No.4 on the New Zealand singles chart. Three other singles from the album also entered the charts in New Zealand: "Dominion Road" (No.31), "Giant Friend" (No.20) and "Your Window" (No 19).

== Track listing ==
(All songs by Don McGlashan except where noted)

1. "Dominion Road" – 3.55
2. "Your Window" – 4.39
3. "She's Like a City" – 3.56
4. "No Plans for Later" – 2.31
5. "Before the Breakthrough" – 4.32
6. "White Valiant" – 5.12
7. "Giant Friend" – 3.15
8. "Big Fish" – 4.33
9. "A Thing Well Made" – 4.39
10. "Nature" (Wayne Mason) – 3.39

== Personnel ==
- Don McGlashan – guitars, voice, euphonium
- Ross Burge – drums
- Alan Gregg – bass guitar, voice
- David Long – guitars

=== Additional personnel ===
- Jan Hellriegel - backing vocals on "Nature"

== Charts ==
=== Weekly charts ===
Chart (1993)	Position
New Zealand Albums (RMNZ)	2

=== Year-end charts ===
Chart (1992)	Position
New Zealand Albums (RMNZ)	43
Chart (1993)	Position
New Zealand Albums (RMNZ)	14
