= Three Leaning Men =

New Zealand band

Fun in the Key of E
- Origin: Palmerston North, New Zealand
- Years active: 1984–1988
- Past members: Alan Gregg; Lindsay Gregg; Rhys Bevan; Nigel Corbett; Gregg Malcolm

Three Leaning Men were a New Zealand 1980s indie band from Palmerston North who recorded one LP, Fun in the Key of E, released by Meltdown Records. The band's debut performance was supporting Sneaky Feelings at the Massey University Social Hall. They also supported Hunters and Collectors, the Chills and New Order.

The band was formed by Lindsay Gregg (guitar), Rhys Bevan (bass) and Nigel Corbett (drums) and joined by second guitarist Greg Malcolm. Rhys Bevan was replaced by Alan Gregg during the recording of their album. Alan Gregg went on to feature in a number of other New Zealand bands, including the Dribbling Darts of Love, the Mutton Birds and Marshmallow. Rhys Bevan moved to the South Island of New Zealand to continue his career as a baker. Lindsay Gregg died in 2011.
