= Salty (album) =

Studio album by The Mutton Birds
- Released: April 1994
- Recorded: November 1993
- Studio: Shortland Street Studios, Auckland
- Genre: Rock
- Length: 63:24
- Label: Virgin/EMI
- Producer: The Mutton Birds

The Mutton Birds chronology
The Mutton Birds (1992)	Salty (1994)	Nature (1995)

Singles from Salty
- 1. "The Heater" Released: 1994; 2. "In My Room" Released: 1994; 3. "Ngaire" Released: 1994; 4. "Anchor Me" Released: 1994

Salty is the second album by the New Zealand rock band The Mutton Birds, released in 1994. Four songs — "The Heater", "Anchor Me", "In My Room" and "Ngaire" — reached the top 20 in the New Zealand singles chart with "The Heater" reaching No.1.

"Don't Fight it, Marsha, It's Bigger Than Both of Us" was originally recorded by an earlier band of McGlashan's, Blam Blam Blam. "The Heater" is used as a plot device in the Christopher Brookmyre novel Be My Enemy; two central characters bond over it, and it is used as a contrast against the manufactured pop music made by a minor villain.

== Track listing ==
(All songs by Don McGlashan except where noted)

1. "The Heater" – 4.22
2. "Ngaire" – 3.52
3. "When the Wind Comes Round" – 5.30
4. "You Will Return" – 4.32
5. "Wellington" (Alan Gregg) – 3.07
6. "In My Room" – 4.35
7. "Queen's English" – 7.07
8. "Salty My Dear" – 1.22
9. "There's a Limit" (Gregg) – 4.13
10. "Esther" (Gregg) – 2.45
11. "No Telling When" – 5.28
12. "Anchor Me" – 4.27
13. "Too Close to the Sun" – 5.31
14. "Don't Fight It Marsha. It's Bigger Than Both of Us" – 4.38

== Personnel ==
- Don McGlashan – guitars, vocals, euphonium, melodica
- Ross Burge – drums, autoharp
- Alan Gregg – bass guitar, vocals, keyboards
- David Long – guitar, vocals, keyboards, banjo

=== Additional personnel ===
- Jane Dodd — backing vocals ("Anchor Me", "Queens English")
