= Marvellous Year =

Studio album by Don McGlashan
- Released: March 2, 2009
- Recorded: July 2007 to October 2008
- Studios: Roundhead Studios, Auckland
- Genre: Rock
- Length: 48:21
- Label: Arch Hill Recordings
- Producers: Don McGlashan and Sean Donnelly

Don McGlashan chronology
Warm Hand (2006)	Marvellous Year (2009)	Lucky Stars (2015)

Professional ratings
Review scores
Source	Rating
AllMusic	4/5 stars
The Courier-Mail	3.5/5 stars
New Zealand Herald	4/5 stars
Sunday Herald Sun	4/5 stars

Marvellous Year is a 2009 album by New Zealand songwriter Don McGlashan and The Seven Sisters.

The album was recorded at Neil Finn's Roundhead Studios in Auckland, and featured Finn on backing vocals on two tracks, "18th Day" and "C2006P1 (Make Yourself at Home)".

The title is drawn from a line in the Allen Curnow poem "The Skeleton of the Great Moa in the Canterbury Museum, Christchurch":

"Not I, some child, born in a marvellous year,
Will learn the trick of standing upright here."

"Bathe in the River" had appeared originally on the soundtrack to the film No. 2, where it had been sung by Hollie Smith. The song won the APRA Silver Scroll in 2006. The closing track, "The Colossus of Roadies", is from a stage show McGlashan worked on with Toa Fraser, director of No. 2.

== Track listing ==
(All songs by Don McGlashan)

1. "The Switch" – 4:29
2. "Bad Blood" – 5:42
3. "Not Ready" – 4:14
4. "You're the Song" – 4:21
5. "Everything's Broken; Life's So Sweet" – 3:58
6. "18th Day" – 6:16
7. "Marvellous Year" – 4.42
8. "Radio Programmer" – 3:33
9. "C2006P1 (Make Yourself at Home)" – 3:05
10. "Bathe in the River" – 5:20
11. "Theme From 'The Colossus of Roadies'" – 2:42

== Personnel ==
- Don McGlashan – vocals, guitars, piano, French horn, euphonium, vibraphone, glockenspiel, mandolin, DM100, bells, backing vocals
- Dominic Blaazer – electric piano, Hammond organ, theremin, moog synthesizer, mandolin, backing vocals
- Chris O'Connor – drums, percussion, hand drum, shaker, backing vocals
- Maree Thom – bass, cello, accordion, backing vocals
- John Segovia – electric guitars, slide guitar, pedal steel guitar, dobro, backing vocals

=== Additional personnel ===
- Sean Donnelly – bass ("Not Ready"), backing vocals ("C2006P1")
- Neil Finn – backing vocals ("18th Day", "C2006P1")
- Mark Hart - backing vocals ("C2006P1")
- Kingsley Melhuish – trumpet ("C2006P1")
- Haydn Godfrey – trombone ("C2006P1")
- Strings on "Not Ready": Ashley Brown, Miranda Adams, Justine Cormack, Christine Bowie
