= Lucky Stars (album) =

Studio album by Don McGlashan
- Released: 17 April 2015 (New Zealand); 30 October 2015 (Australia)
- Studios: Roundhead Studios, Auckland
- Genre: Rock
- Length: 40:34
- Label: Self-released
- Producers: Don McGlashan, David Long

Don McGlashan chronology
Marvellous Year (2009)	Lucky Stars (2015)	Bright November Morning (2022)

Professional ratings
Review scores
Source	Rating
New Zealand Herald	5/5 stars
Metro magazine	8/10 stars
Sunday Herald Sun	3/5 stars
The Age	4.5/5 stars
The Courier-Mail	5/5 stars

Lucky Stars is the third solo album by New Zealand musician Don McGlashan. It was released in 2015. McGlashan began writing songs for the album at a small beach house on the Thames Estuary, then moved to Neil Finn's writing room at Roundhead Studios in Auckland to begin recording them with guitarist Tom Rodwell. The pair were joined by former Mutton Birds guitarist David Long and former Seven Sisters member and current Phoenix Foundation drummer Chris O'Connor.

McGlashan said he had altered his songwriting approach on the album, explaining: "It is more personal and I'm not adopting characters to explore an idea ... the 'I' is generally me in this lot." He said "When the Trumpets Sound"—"a brutal song about all the things you've done wrong catching up with you"—had been commissioned by playwright and film director Toa Fraser. McGlashan said: "He needed a song for the middle section of his [2013] film of the Royal New Zealand Ballet's Giselle and he'd been listening to Blood on the Tracks: songs about going down the road feeling bad. That was the template he was using and he said, 'Why don't you try writing a song like that?'"

McGlashan said Lucky Stars was "probably the first album I've done for a long, long time that when it was finished I was really keen to get started on the next one because I'd enjoyed the process so much."

== Track listing ==
(All songs by Don McGlashan)

1. "Girl, Make Your Mind Up" – 4:36
2. "Lucky Stars" – 3:47
3. "Hold On to Your Loneliness" – 3:33
4. "Home to the Other Side" – 4:09
5. "When the Trumpets Sound" – 4:53
6. "For Your Touch" – 4:13
7. "Charles Kingsford Smith" – 4:23
8. "Come Back to Me" – 3:16
9. "On My Way To You" – 3:42
10. "The Waves Would Roll On" – 3:56

== Personnel ==
- Don McGlashan – vocals, acoustic guitars, percussion, piano, horns, Cantarini organ, bass
- Tom Rodwell – vocals, electric and acoustic guitars
- Chris O'Connor – drums, percussion
- David Long – bowed banjo, Cantarini organ, percussion, banjo
- David Garner – cello ("When the Trumpets Sound")
- Iselta Allison – viola
- John Bell – vibraphone ("On My Way to You")
