= Bright November Morning =

2022 album by Don McGlashan

Studio album by Don McGlashan
- Released: 25 February 2022
- Length: 46:29
- Producer: Don McGlashan & the Others

Don McGlashan chronology
Lucky Stars (2015)	Bright November Morning (2022)

Singles from Something to Feel
- 1. "Now's the Place" Released: 17 September 2021; 2. "Go Back In" Released: 12 November 2021; 3. "All the Goodbyes in the World" Released: 11 February 2022

Bright November Morning is the fourth solo studio album by New Zealand musician Don McGlashan. Released in February 2022, the album debuted at number one on the Official New Zealand Music Chart.

== Production ==
The album was recorded and produced by Don McGlashan & The Others, a band which included McGlashan, James Duncan on bass and keyboards, Chris O'Connor on drums and Shayne P. Carter as the band's guitarist. In addition, musicians Hollie Smith and The Beths featured on the album. Due to the effects of the COVID-19 pandemic in New Zealand, McGlashan found himself breaking old habits.

The song "Lights Come On" was inspired by McGlashan's early days with the Mutton Birds, while "Sunscreen" is an ode to New Zealand summers. "John Bryce" was inspired by New Zealand politician John Bryce and the government attack on Parihaka in November 1881.

== Release and promotion ==
The album was preceded by three singles, "Now's the Place" in September 2021, "Go Back In" in November, and "All the Goodbyes in the World" in February 2022. When Bright November Morning was released in February 2022, it became McGlashan's first number one album in New Zealand.

== Track listing ==
Bright November Morning track listing
No.	Title	Writer(s)	Length
1.	"Lights Come On"	Don McGlashan	4:24
2.	"John Bryce"	McGlashan	3:31
3.	"Go Back In"	McGlashan	4:00
4.	"Sunscreen"	McGlashan	5:42
5.	"Now's the Place"	McGlashan; Harry Sinclair	4:10
6.	"Shackleton"	McGlashan	5:40
7.	"All the Goodbyes in the World"	McGlashan; James Duncan; Luke Buda	4:07
8.	"Nothing on the Windows"	McGlashan	5:25
9.	"Song for Sue"	McGlashan	5:41
10.	"Start Again"	McGlashan	3:49
Total length:			46:29

== Credits and personnel ==
- The Beths – backing vocals (2)
- Shayne P. Carter – backing vocals, lead guitar
- Chris Chetland – mastering
- Anita Clark – violin (9)
- Chris Close – recording assistant at Sitting Room
- James Duncan – backing vocals, bass, keyboards
- Ben Edwards – recording
- Jarrod Edwards – recording assistant at NoiseFloor
- Emily Fairlight – backing vocals (10)
- Bob Frisbee – recording
- Elmore Jones – recording assistant at Sitting Room
- Don McGlashan – guitar, keyboards, tenor horn, vocals
- Don McGlashan & the Others – performer, producer
- Chris O'Connor – backing vocals, drums, percussion
- Hollie Smith – backing vocals (2)
- Luke Tomes – mixing

== Charts ==
Weekly chart performance for Bright November Morning
Chart (2022)	Peak position
New Zealand Albums (RMNZ)	1

== Release history ==
Release dates and formats for Bright November Morning
Region	Date	Format(s)	Label(s)	Ref.
Various	25 February 2022	CD; vinyl; digital download; streaming	Don McGlashan	
