= Bathe in the River =

2006 single by Mt Raskil Preservation Society

Single by Mt Raskil Preservation Society featuring Hollie Smith

from the album No. 2: Original Motion Picture Soundtrack
- Released: 2006
- Length: 4:25
- Label: EMI
- Songwriter(s): Don McGlashan
- Producer(s): Don McGlashan

Hollie Smith singles chronology
"Hollie Smith" (2006)	"Bathe in the River" (2006)	"Sensitive to a Smile" (2008)

"Bathe in the River" is a single released by New Zealand supergroup Mt Raskil Preservation Society featuring New Zealand soul singer Hollie Smith. It appears on the soundtrack for the 2006 New Zealand film No. 2.

"Bathe in the River" peaked at No. 2 on the New Zealand Singles Chart and spent 37 weeks in the top 40, becoming the country's third-best-selling single of 2006. It was certified gold by the Recording Industry Association of New Zealand (RIANZ) in June 2006. The song was nominated for Single of the Year at the 2006 New Zealand Music Awards, and songwriter Don McGlashan won the 2006 APRA Silver Scroll for "Bathe in the River". His own version of the song appears on his 2009 solo album, Marvellous Year.

== Mt Raskil Preservation Society ==
Mt Raskil Preservation Society was a supergroup put together specifically to record "Bathe in the River" for the soundtrack of the New Zealand film No. 2. As well as featured vocalist Hollie Smith, the group also included singer Bella Kalolo, musicians David Long, and Sean Donnelly, and Auckland's Jubilation Choir, as well as musicians Stephen Small (Piano), Jason Smith (Hammond organ), Will Scott (drums), Steve Roche (Trumpet), Toby Laing (Trumpet), and Don McGlashan (Euphonium). The group's name, thought up by film-maker Toa Fraser, is a pun on the Auckland suburb of Mount Roskill, where the film No. 2 was set.

== Track listing ==
New Zealand CD single
No.	Title	Length
1.	"Bathe in the River"
2.	"Bathe in the River" (video)

== Charts ==
=== Weekly charts ===
Chart (2006)	Peak position
New Zealand (Recorded Music NZ)	2

=== Year-end charts ===
Chart (2006)	Position
New Zealand (RIANZ)	3

== Certifications ==
Region	Certification	Certified units/sales
New Zealand (RMNZ)	Gold	5,000^{*}
^{*} Sales figures based on certification alone.
