= Meltdown Records =

Independent record label

- Founded: 1985
- Founder: Peter Shepherd
- Country of origin: New Zealand
- Location: Palmerston North

Meltdown Records was a small independent record label based in Palmerston North, New Zealand, that operated from 1985 to 1989. It was owned by Massey University student Peter Shepherd, later Professor of Cell Signalling, Molecular Medicine and Pathology at the University of Auckland and awardee of the Callaghan Medal in 2017, and part funded by the Massey University Students Association.

The label was "steered by" Massey University-based bands Dosage B, the Mannequins and the Remarkables. During its four years of operation, Meltdown released 10 records. Its first recording was by for Dosage B, a band led by Jeremy Corbett, who subsequently became a well known radio host in New Zealand. It recorded an EP by the Remarkables and the album Fun in the Key of E by Three Leaning Men, these two groups being early bands of New Zealand musician Alan Gregg. Another was an EP by the Pterodactyls, which featured former Chills member Martin Kean. National Library of New Zealand information says that they also recorded the bands Thin Red Line, Cement Garden, the End, Iceland Bars, Polar Bears, Swiss Kids, Statmux, Harry Death, and Coloured Talk.

In 1986 Meltdown Records featured on TV show Video Dispatch. In March 1987 they organised and ran the Rheineck Rock Festival at the Palmerston North Showgrounds in conjunction with Radio 92.2XS Stereo FM Radio.

Meltdown's demise began in 1987 when EMI closed in New Zealand, meaning that they were unable to get their records pressed at a reasonable cost. Releases were now costing $20 per record, but only retailing for $8 each. In 1989, after releasing Melter Smelter, Meltdown Records ceased production.

== See also ==
- List of New Zealand record labels
