= No. 2: Original Motion Picture Soundtrack =

Soundtrack album to No. 2 by Various artists
- Released: 2 February 2006
- Genre: Pop
- Label: EMI
- Producer: Various artists

Singles from No. 2: Original Motion Picture Soundtrack
- 1. "Bathe in the River" Released: 28 July 2006

No. 2: Original Motion Picture Soundtrack is the soundtrack to the New Zealand film No. 2. It was released alongside the film in 2006 by EMI

The soundtrack has been compiled by Don McGlashan and features the soulful and urban sounds of Tha Feelstyle, Che Fu, and Trinity Roots.

The lead single from the soundtrack, "Bathe In the River", was written by Don McGlashan and performed by an all-star cast including the vocal talents of Hollie Smith.

Don McGlashan won the 2006 APRA Silver Scroll for "Bathe in the River".

== Track listing ==
1. "The Medicine" - Tha Feelstyle
2. "Bathe in the River" - Mt Raskil Preservation Society featuring Hollie Smith
3. "Overture/Sai Levuka" - Don McGlashan
4. "Waka" - Che Fu
5. "Early Morning No. 2" - Don McGlashan
6. "Mt. Roskill/Chasing the Pig" - Don McGlashan
7. "Hold Tight" - Che Fu
8. "Wai Ni Bu Ni Ovalau" - Fijian Festival Performers
9. "Nanna Takes Control/Meke (Action Dance)" - Don McGlashan
10. "Core 'ngrato" - Shaun Dixon
11. "Nanna's Entrance" - Don McGlashan
12. "Chulu Chululu" - Mila with Eddie Lund And His Tahitians
13. "Break It To Pieces" - Tha Feelstyle
14. "Home, Land and Sea" - TrinityRoots
15. "Intermezzo from Cavalleria Rusticana" - Christchurch Symphony Orchestra
