= List of New Zealand record labels =

This is a list of notable record labels based in New Zealand.

- Arch Hill Recordings
- Dawn Raid Entertainment
- Dirty Records
- Failsafe Records
- Flying Nun Records
- Illegal Musik
- King Worldwide
- Lil' Chief Records
- Meltdown Records
- Ode Records
- Propeller Records
- She'll Be Right Records
- South Indies
- TANZA
- Uprising Records
- Viking Records
- Wildside Records
- Xpressway
- Zodiac Records

== See also ==
- List of record labels
