= Peter Bannister =

British-born New Zealand botanist (1939–2008)

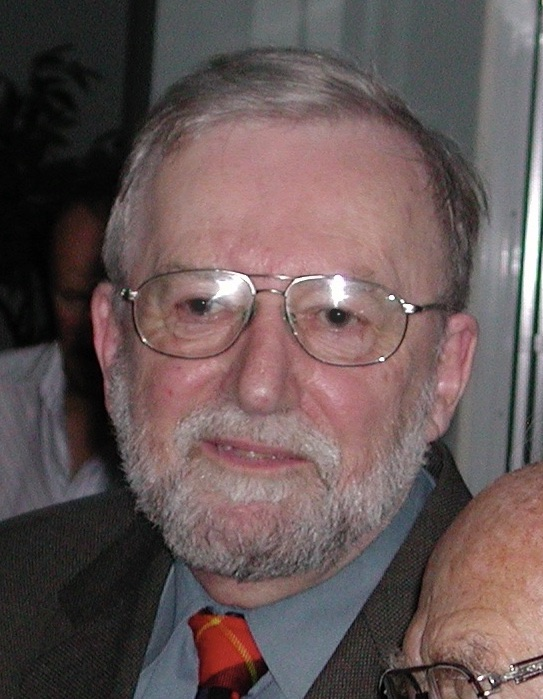
- Bannister in 2005
- Born: 2 May 1939; England
- Died: 26 February 2008 (aged 68); Dunedin, New Zealand
- Education: BSc (University of Nottingham); PhD (University of Aberdeen)
- Known for: Ecophysiology
- Relatives: Matthew Bannister (son)
- Awards: New Zealand Society of Plant Physiologists Outstanding Physiologist Award (2003)
- Scientific career
- Fields: Botany
- Workplaces: University of Glasgow; University of Stirling; University of Otago
- Thesis: The water relations of certain heath plants with reference to their ecological amplitude (1963)

Peter Bannister (2 May 1939 – 26 February 2008) was an English-born New Zealand botanist and academic.

== Academic career ==
Peter Bannister completed a BSc in botany in 1960 at the University of Nottingham and a PhD in 1963 at the University of Aberdeen. Bannister was a lecturer at the University of Glasgow and senior lecturer at the University of Stirling, before being appointed Professor and Head of the Department of Botany at the University of Otago in 1979, succeeding Professor Geoff Baylis, who had retired the previous year. Bannister was Head of Department until 2002, and awarded the title of emeritus professor upon his retirement in 2005.

Bannister's PhD was in the relatively new field of physiological ecology, and was entitled "The water relations of certain heath plants with reference to their ecological amplitude". Bannister researched plant water relations, resistance to drought and heat, mineral nutrition and carbohydrate economy of heath plants. He published an introductory text book on physiological plant ecology in 1976. Over his research career, Bannister published over 110 scholarly papers, including significant works on mistletoes, frost tolerance of New Zealand plants, alpine plants and lichens. Bannister was awarded the "Outstanding Plant Physiologist" award in 2003 in recognition of an outstanding contribution to the study of plant biology by the New Zealand Society of Plant Physiologists (now the New Zealand Society of Plant Biologists).

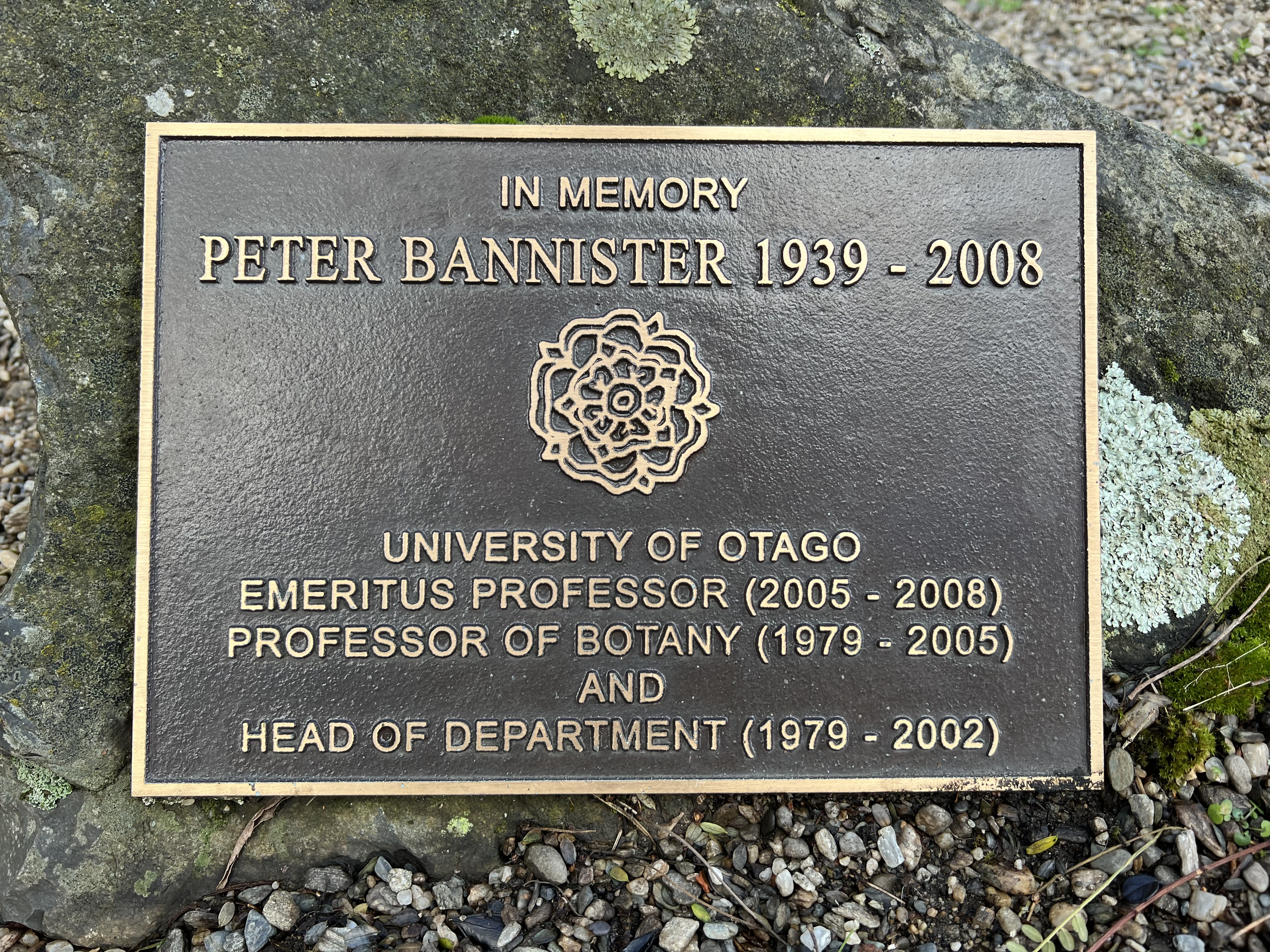
Plaque commemorating Peter Bannister at the Department of Botany, University of Otago.

Bannister was patron of the Botanical Society of Otago from 2004 until his death. The Jack Bannister Memorial Bike Shed, at the Department Botany, University of Otago was partly funded by Bannister and is named in honour of Bannister's father Jack, a keen cyclist. The Bannister Laboratory in the Department of Botany Research Building is named in his honour.

Bannister is commemorated by a plaque and kōwhai (Sophora microphylla) at the Department of Botany, University of Otago, planted on 26 February 2009, the first anniversary of his death. The Peter Bannister Student Field Grant Award was first awarded in 2014 by the Botanical Society of Otago to assist postgraduate students with fieldwork.

== Personal life ==
Bannister was a talented botanical and life artist and was an artist member of the Dunedin Art Society. Bannister was a judge of the Audrey Eagle Botanical Drawing Competition run by the Botanical Society of Otago.

Bannister's son Matthew is a Scottish-born New Zealand musician, journalist and academic. Bannister's second wife is paleobotanist Jennifer M Bannister.

== Selected publications ==
- Bannister P. 2013. "Godley review: A touch of frost? Cold hardiness of plants in the southern hemisphere". New Zealand Journal of Botany 45, 1–33. doi:10.1080/00288250709509700
