= Matthew Bannister (musician) =

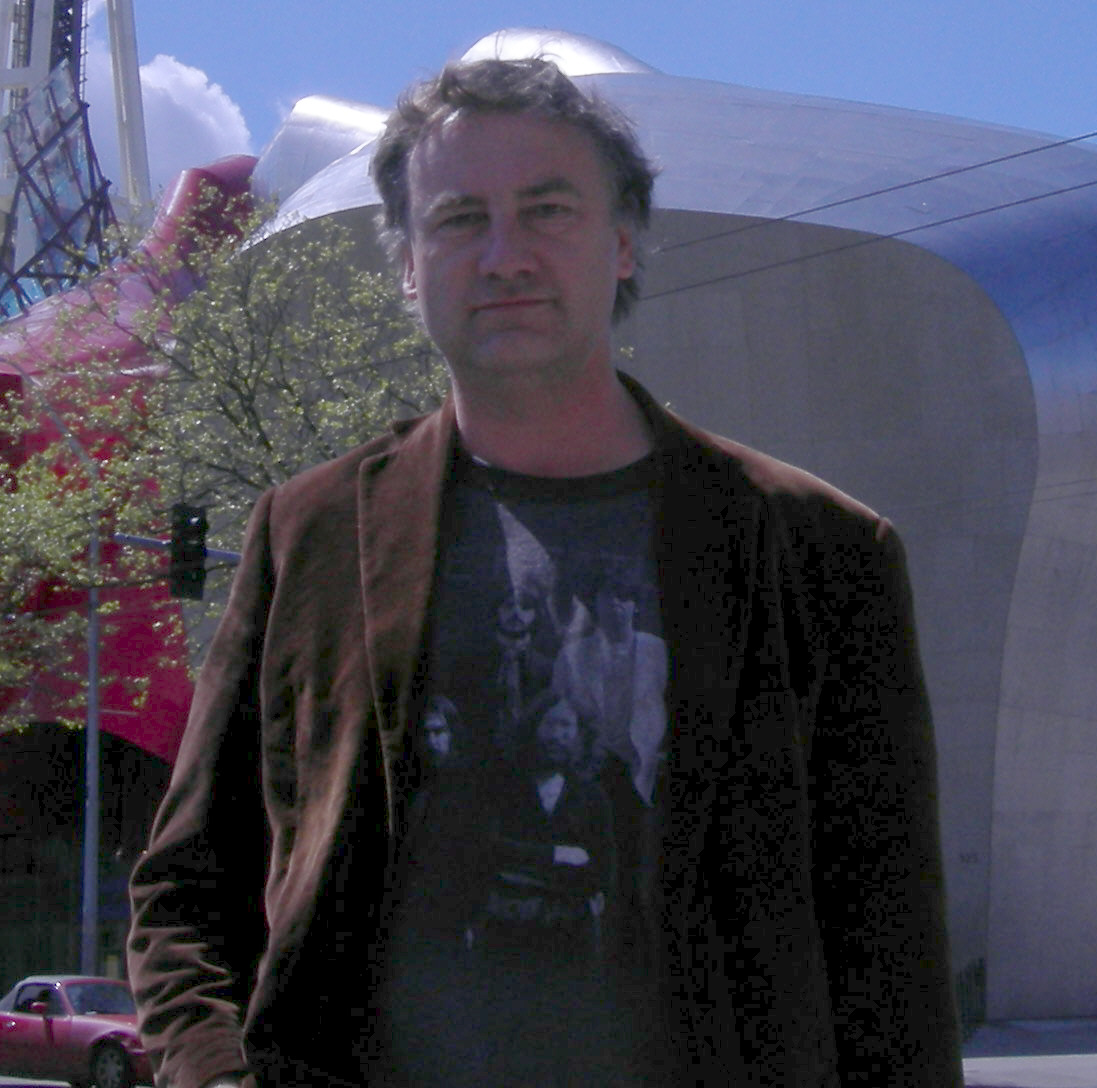
- Bannister outside Experience Music Project in Seattle, Washington during the 2007 Pop Conference

Background information
- Born: 1962 (age 63–64); Aberdeen, Scotland
- Occupations: Musician, media theoretician
- Instruments: Vocals, guitar
- Years active: 1981–present
- Scientific career
- Thesis: White man’s soul : Pakeha masculinities in popular music of New Zealand / Aotearoa (2002)

Matthew Bannister (born 1962) is a Scottish-born New Zealand musician, journalist and academic.

== Musical career ==
Bannister had a stint as a teenager in the late 1970s playing rhythm guitar in working men's clubs and other unlicensed venues with Gavin Keen (lead guitar), Graeme Dooley (drums) and Spike Quinn (bass) in the 1960s covers band Feedback. In 1980, while he was a student at the University of Otago in Dunedin, he co-founded the band Sneaky Feelings, for which he was a vocalist, lead guitarist, and songwriter.

"Husband House", a song written and sung by Bannister, was recorded in 1985. It was released as a single and included on Take Sides later that year. A mid-tempo ballad, it was later called Sneaky Feelings's "career highpoint" by Flying Nun founder Roger Shepherd. The song spent 7 weeks in the national top 40, peaking at #16.

After Sneaky Feelings dissolved in 1989, Bannister formed Dribbling Darts of Love and worked as a journalist and reviewer. Both bands had music released on the Flying Nun record label. He has also worked briefly with The Mutton Birds.

He released a solo album, Moth, in 2007 as One Man Bannister. In 2008 he released an album with The Weather called Aroha Ave, and in 2011 a self-titled album with The Changing Same. The next two One Man Bannister albums, Evolver (2013) and Rubber Solo (2019) are re-recordings of entire Beatles albums (Revolver and Rubber Soul respectively).

As Matthew Bannister, rather than One Man Bannister, he released The Dark Backward in 2025. Most songs on this album revolved around the concept of time.

=== Positively George Street ===
In the mid-1990s, Bannister began writing a memoir about his experiences as a musician in the 1980s Dunedin scene. Partly, this was a response to concerns he had over being "written out" of New Zealand's indie music history: "I published a book ... about Sneaky Feelings because I felt we were being written out of the label's history and indeed out of indie history, for example, our non-appearance in various articles about Flying Nun, in indie discographies, and in local ... rock polls". This book, Positively George Street, was published in 1999.

== Academic career ==
In 1998, Bannister returned to full-time study as a PhD candidate in the Department of Film, TV and Media Studies at the University of Auckland, graduating in 2003. His thesis was titled White Man's Soul: Pakeha masculinities in the popular music of New Zealand / Aotearoa. A revised version of the thesis appeared as a book, White Boys, White Noise: Masculinities and 1980s Guitar Rock, in the Ashgate Popular Music and Folk Series in 2006.

He now works at the Waikato Institute of Technology (WINTEC) as a Theory/Post Graduate advisor in the School of Media Arts. In 2021 his book Eye of the Taika: New Zealand Comedy and the Films of Taika Waititi was published.

== Personal life ==
Bannister's father Peter was a botanist working at Otago University. Bannister is married to Dribbling Darts/The Weather bandmate Alice Bulmer, whom he met while they were both working at Auckland University Library in 1989. His son, Albert, plays bass with The Changing Same.

== Bands ==
- Sneaky Feelings 1981–89, 1992
- Dribbling Darts (originally Dribbling Darts of Love) 1989–1993
- The Mutton Birds (played the guitar on tour in 1999)
- The Weather 2004–2009
- The Changing Same 2009–present

== Solo albums ==
Released as "One Man Bannister":

- Moth (2007)
- Evolver (2013)
- Rubber Solo (2019)

As Matthew Bannister: The Dark Backward (Powertool Records, 2025).

== Publications ==
- Bannister, Matthew (1999). Positively George Street. Auckland: Reed Books. ISBN 0-7900-0704-5
- Bannister, Matthew (2002). White Man's Soul: pakeha masculinities in popular music of New Zealand / Aotearoa, PhD thesis, University of Auckland.
- Bannister, Matthew (2005). "Kiwi Blokes Recontextualising White New Zealand Masculinities in a Global Setting," Genders Journal, no. 42.
- Bannister, Matthew (2006a). "'Loaded': Indie Guitar Rock, Canonism, White Masculinities," Popular Music 25, no. 1: 77–95.
- Bannister, Matthew (2006b). White Boys, White Noise: Masculinities and 1980s Guitar Rock. Burlington, VT: Ashgate Publishing, Ltd. ISBN 0-7546-5190-8
