= Humour and the Misfortune of Others =

Studio album by Hollie Smith
- Released: 15 March 2010
- Genres: Soul, funk
- Length: 56:43
- Label: Soundsmith/EMI
- Producer: Riki Gooch

Hollie Smith chronology
Long Player (2007)	Humour and the Misfortune of Others (2010)

Singles from Humour and the Misfortune of Others
- 1. "Mamma" Released: 8 March 2010

Humour and the Misfortune of Others is the second studio album by New Zealand soul singer Hollie Smith. It was released on 15 March 2010.

== Reception ==
Professional ratings
Review scores
Source	Rating
The New Zealand Herald	5/5 stars
The Dominion Post	3.5/5 stars
The Nelson Mail	3.5/5 stars

Russell Baillie of The New Zealand Herald gave the album five stars, praising its "big angry and/or anguished anthems, clearly venting about her life and career's ups and downs". Nick Ward of The Nelson Mail gave the album three-and-a-half stars, saying of it "Smith's voice has picked up a raspy edge that comes and goes, but she begins to loosen the restraints and show more melodic inventiveness".

== Track listing ==
1. "Mamma" – 4:06
2. "Vs 19:19" – 4:54
3. "Let Me Go" – 3:42
4. "By My Side" – 4:48
5. "Humour" – 4:44
6. "Finding Home" – 5:03
7. "Hiding" – 3:41
8. "Overtime" – 6:42
9. "Before This Day Is Done" – 5:11
10. "Why Can't We Get Along" – 5:25
11. "Brothers, Friends, Lovers" – 4:01
12. "Will You Be the One?" – 4:26

New Zealand iTunes Store download only
13. "Track by Track" – 19:42

== Personnel ==
- Darren Mathiassen – drums
- Crete Haami – bass
- Tyson Smith – guitar
- Mark Vanilau - Keyboards, Grand Piano

== Chart performance ==
Humour and the Misfortune of Others debuted at number one on the RIANZ New Zealand Albums Chart, the week of its release. It follows Smith's previous album, Long Player's number-one debut.

Chart (2010)	Peak position
New Zealand Albums Chart	1
