= Kader Toy Factory fire =

1993 factory fire in Thailand

Coordinates: 13.734704°N 100.329894°E

- Native name: เหตุเพลิงไหม้โรงงานเคเดอร์
- Date: 10 May 1993
- Time: 16:00 (UTC+07:00)
- Location: Sam Phran District, Nakhon Pathom, Thailand
- Type: Industrial fire
- Deaths: 188 (174 women and teenage girls)
- Injuries: 469

The Kader Toy Factory fire occurred in Thailand on 10 May 1993. It is considered the worst industrial factory fire in history, killing 188 persons, and injuring 469. Most of the victims were young female workers from rural families.

== Kader Toy factory ==
The factory manufactured stuffed toys and licensed plastic dolls primarily intended for export to the United States and other developed countries. The toys were produced for Disney, Mattel, and others. The factory was on Phutthamonthon Sai 4 Road, in the Sam Phran District of Nakhon Pathom Province. The structures that were destroyed in the blaze were all owned and operated directly by Kader Industrial (Thailand). Kader Industrial was owned by a variety of individuals and businesses from Hong Kong, Taiwan, and Thailand, including Kader Group and Charoen Pokphand. Kader Industrial had two sister companies that also operated at the same site on a lease arrangement.

The factory was poorly designed and built. Fire exits drawn in the building plans were not, in fact, constructed, and the existing external doors were locked. The building was reinforced with uninsulated steel girders which quickly weakened and collapsed when they were heated by the flames.

== Fire ==
At about 16:00 on May 10, 1993, a small fire was discovered on the first floor of part of the E-shaped building. This portion of the building was used to package and store finished products, meaning there was a significant amount of fuel load present. Fuel loads composed of fabrics, plastics, materials used for stuffing, and additional workplace materials were found in each building of the Kader facility. Workers located in the upper floors were told the fire was minor and were instructed to keep working. The fire alarm in the building did not sound. Areas dedicated to storing finished products caused the fire to spread quickly. Other parts of the factory were full of raw materials which also burned very fast.

Workers in Building One who tried to escape found the ground floor exit doors locked, and the stairwells soon collapsed on top of the workers due to the fire. Many workers jumped from the second, third, and fourth-floor windows in order to escape the flames, resulting in severe injuries and fatalities. Local security guards attempted to put out the flames, but were unsuccessful. A call was made to the local Nakhon Pathom Fire Department at 16:21.

Firefighters arrived at the factory at about 16:40 and found Building One about to collapse. Rapid spread of the fire due largely to the many flammable materials stored within contributed to the building’s collapse at 17:14, just 53 minutes after the fire department was called.

Fire alarms in Buildings Two and Three had sounded and all workers inside were able to escape before flames spread to the buildings. The fire brigades from Nakhon Pathom and neighboring Bangkok were able to extinguish the fires before these two buildings were destroyed.

Even with the help of hydraulic cranes, it took several days to remove all of the bodies of the victims left in the rubble of Building One.

== Aftermath ==
Most victims were taken by ambulance to the Sriwichai II Hospital, where 20 died. When the northern stairwell of the collapsed Building One was searched, the bodies of many others were found. These victims died of smoke inhalation, the flames, or the collapse of the building. More people were killed in the fire than in the Triangle Shirtwaist Factory fire; despite this, the incident received little media attention outside Thailand.

== Media references ==
New Zealand singer-songwriter Don McGlashan released a song about the disaster named "Toy Factory Fire", on his 2006 album Warm Hand. The song is narrated from the imagined perspective of a New York-based toy company executive who, in the week of the 10th anniversary of the fire, is looking at a number of photographs of the disaster's aftermath. "Here's Bart Simpson with his arms all melted and twisted," he begins. And later: "They said it was a death trap from a text book... Keeping them [the photos] hidden was the best work I ever did."

== See also ==
- 1990 Bangkok gas explosion
- Rana Plaza collapse

== Bibliography ==
- "10 Years After the Kader Toy Factory Fire: Thailand's CP Group and Corporate Responsibility". Asian Food Worker. 18 July 2003. Archived from the original on 8 February 2004.
- Bintliff, Esther (26 April 2013). "On Bangladesh, and some of the worst factory disasters in history". www.ft.com. Financial Times.
- Grant, Casey Cavanaugh (2012). "Case Study: The Kader Toy Factory Fire". ILO Encyclopaedia of Occupational Health and Safety.
- Haines, Fiona (December 2003). "Regulatory Reform in Light of Regulatory Character: Assessing Industrial Safety Change in the Aftermath of the Kader Toy Factory Fire in Bangkok, Thailand". Social & Legal Studies. 12 (4): 461–487. doi:10.1177/0964663903012004003. hdl:1885/33389.
- Haines, Fiona (2005). Globalization and regulatory character: regulatory reform after the Kader Toy Factory fire. Aldershot: Ashgate. ISBN 0-7546-2563-X.
- "Kader's Thai connection". South China Morning Post. 16 May 1993. Archived from the original on 4 August 2021.
- Symonds, Peter (1997). Industrial Inferno: The Story of the Thai Toy Factory Fire. Labour Press Books. ISBN 9781875639168.
- Symonds, Peter (16 May 2003). "Thai toy factory fire: 10 years after the world's worst industrial inferno". World Socialist Web Site.
