= Anchor Me (song) =

1994 single by The Mutton Birds

Single by The Mutton Birds

from the album Salty
- B-side: "When The Wind Comes Round"
- Released: 1994
- Genre: Rock
- Length: 4:27
- Label: Virgin
- Songwriter: Don McGlashan
- Producer: The Mutton Birds

The Mutton Birds singles chronology
"Ngaire" (1994)	"Anchor Me" (1994)	"She's Been Talking" (1996)

"Anchor Me" is a 1994 single by New Zealand rock band The Mutton Birds. The song peaked at #10 in the New Zealand singles chart, and charted for nine weeks. The song was from the group's 1993 album Salty, with three other album tracks used on the single. "Anchor Me" is a love song, written by the Mutton Birds' lead singer Don McGlashan about his wife.

Songwriter Don McGlashan won the 1994 APRA Silver Scroll songwriting award for "Anchor Me", the first of his two Silver Scrolls. McGlashan was also nominated for Best Songwriter for "Anchor Me" at the 1995 New Zealand Music Awards.

== Track listing ==
1. "Anchor Me" (Remix Edit) – 4:27
2. "When The Wind Comes Round" – 5:30
3. "Esther" – 2:48
4. "Don't Fight It Marsha, It's Bigger Than Both Of Us" – 4:38

== Uses in popular culture ==
- Perfect Strangers (2003 feature film). With a new version of the song recorded for the film, McGlashan appears in the film as part of a fictitious band called The Blackouts who perform the song in a bar scene.
- Boy (2004 short film) soundtrack
- After the 2008 New Zealand general election, Television New Zealand used "Anchor Me" in a montage of images showing people celebrating the New Zealand National Party's victory. McGlashan wrote an angry letter to the network expressing his displeasure with the song being used in this context, saying he had never voted National and "would rather have sex with a very ugly crayfish than let them use my music".

== Charts ==
Chart (1994)	Peak position
New Zealand (Recorded Music NZ)	10

== Certifications ==
Region	Certification	Certified units/sales
New Zealand (RMNZ)	2× Platinum	60,000^{‡}
^{‡} Sales+streaming figures based on certification alone.

== Greenpeace version ==
"Anchor Me"

Single by Greenpeace
- Released: July 4, 2005
- Recorded: York Street Studio, Auckland, 14 May 2005
- Genre: Rock
- Length: 4:43
- Label: Festival Mushroom Records
- Songwriter: Don McGlashan
- Producer: Murray Grindlay

In 2005, a charity supergroup of New Zealand artists recorded the song to commemorate the 20th anniversary of the bombing of the Greenpeace ship Rainbow Warrior. The song peaked at #3 in the New Zealand singles chart.

The idea of a commemorative song was decided in April 2005, with studio time booked before the song or singers had been selected. Songwriter Don McGlashan agreed for "Anchor Me" to be used, but chose not to be involved in the recording, as he felt doing so would put the emphasis on him, rather than the bombing commemoration. A group of young New Zealand artists was quickly gathered to record the song, which was eventually released on 4 July 2005.

=== Line-up ===
In order of performance:

- Hinewehi Mohi
- Kirsten Morrell
- Che Fu
- Anika Moa
- Milan Borich (Pluto)
- David Atai and Donald McNulty (Nesian Mystik)
- Nainz and Viiz Tupai (Adeaze)

=== Charts ===
Chart (2005)	Peak position
New Zealand (Recorded Music NZ)	3
