= The Heater =

Single by The Mutton Birds

from the album Salty
- Released: 1994
- Recorded: Shortland Street Studios and Revolver Studios, Auckland
- Genre: Rock
- Length: 4:15
- Label: Virgin
- Songwriter(s): Don McGlashan
- Producer(s): The Mutton Birds

The Mutton Birds singles chronology
"Your Window" (1993)	"The Heater" (1994)	"In My Room" (1994)

"The Heater" was the first single from Salty, the second album by the New Zealand band, The Mutton Birds. Released early in 1994, it reached number one in the New Zealand music charts, their only number 1.

== Music video ==
Its music video starred Elizabeth McRae, well known at the time for playing Marjorie Brasch in the New Zealand soap opera Shortland Street.

== Novel mention ==
The song is mentioned in the Christopher Brookmyre novel Be My Enemy.

== Track listing ==
1. "The Heater"
2. "The Ballad of Kelvin"
3. "He Turned Around"
4. "It Happened One Night"
