= Songs from the Front Lawn =

Studio album by the Front Lawn
- Released: 9 August 1989
- Genre: Pop
- Labels: Front Lawn, Virgin
- Producer: The Front Lawn

The Front Lawn chronology
| Songs from the Front Lawn (1989) | More Songs From the Front Lawn (1993) |

Songs from the Front Lawn is the debut album by the New Zealand musical/theatrical duo the Front Lawn. It was released on 9 August 1989. Jennifer Ward-Lealand contributed to the album.

== Track listing ==
All tracks are written by the Front Lawn (Harry Sinclair and Don McGlashan).

| No. | Title | Length |
|---|---|---|
| 1. | "When You Come Back Home" | 3:35 |
| 2. | "Theme from 'The Lounge Bar'" | 3:54 |
| 3. | "How You Doing" | 3:42 |
| 4. | "Walk Around the House" | 3:07 |
| 5. | "Andy" | 4:34 |
| 6. | "Tomorrow Night" | 3:49 |
| 7. | "Claude Rains" | 4:35 |
| 8. | "Tell Me What to Do" | 3:53 |
| 9. | "A Man and a Woman" | 3:06 |
| 10. | "I'll Never Have Anything More" | 2:42 |

== Personnel ==
- Don McGlashan – guitars, vocals, drums
- Harry Sinclair – concertina, vocals
- Jennifer Ward-Lealand – backing vocals, ukulele
- David Long – guitars
- Janet Roddick – backing vocals, trombone, organ, percussion
- Steve Roche – trumpet, marimba, percussion
- Anthony Donaldson – drums, washboard, percussion
- Neill Duncan – saxophones, percussion
- David Donaldson – double bass, electric bass

== Charts ==
| Chart | Peak position |
|---|---|
| New Zealand Albums Chart | 40 |
