= The Front Lawn =

New Zealand musical/theatrical duo

- Origin: Auckland, New Zealand
- Genres: Pop, musical theatre, performance art, comedy
- Years active: 1985–1993
- Labels: Front Lawn Records, Virgin Records
- Past members: Don McGlashan; Harry Sinclair; Jennifer Ward-Lealand

The Front Lawn was a New Zealand musical/theatrical duo founded by Don McGlashan and Harry Sinclair in 1985. In 1989 and 1990, they were joined by actor Jennifer Ward-Lealand. The Front Lawn were known for their live performances, and toured extensively in New Zealand, Australia, Europe and America. They released two albums and made three short films.

Don McGlashan went on to form New Zealand band The Mutton Birds, and had a successful solo career. Harry Sinclair has written and directed television and feature films, including Topless Women Talk About Their Lives, The Price of Milk, Toy Love, and the reborn 90210.

The pair reunited to work on the children's TV series Kiri and Lou, broadcast from 2019 onwards, with Sinclair writing and directing, McGlashan scoring, and both writing songs, credited as "The Front Lawn".

The Front Lawn's music and short films were a major influence on the musical comedy duo Flight of the Conchords.

== Performance ==
The Front Lawn toured Europe, America, Australia and New Zealand with a series of live shows including Songs and Stories from The Front Lawn, The Reason for Breakfast, The Washing Machine, The Story of Robert and "The One That Got Away". They performed at the Edinburgh Festival, in 1988 and 1989, winning The Independent newspaper's theatre award for the festival in 1988, and in both years were included in the "Pick of the Fringe" season at London's Donmar Warehouse.

== Music ==
The Front Lawn released two albums – Songs From The Front Lawn (1989) and More Songs from the Front Lawn (1993). They also had two singles in the New Zealand top 50 – "When You Come Back Home" (#49) and "The Beautiful Things" (#22). Their song "Andy" was voted as number 82 in the APRA Top 100 New Zealand Songs of All Time list. The group won three New Zealand Music Awards in 1989: Most Promising Group, Best Film Soundtrack/Compilation and International Achievement.

== Short films ==
- Walkshort (1987)
- The Lounge Bar (1988)
- Linda's Body (1990)

Sinclair and McGlashan made several short films: Walk Short (in which between them, they played every character on screen), The Lounge Bar (which was featured in North America's First Annual International Festival of Short Films as one of the "world's best live-action shorts"), and Linda's Body (which won Best Short Film at the New Zealand Film Awards). Of their three short films, two – "Walk Short" and "The Lounge Bar" – were screened by Channel 4 in the UK, and "The Lounge Bar" was a finalist in the 1989 American Film Festival.

== Discography ==
=== Albums ===
Year	Title	Details	Peak chart positions
Year	Title	Details	NZ
1989	Songs From The Front Lawn	Label: Front Lawn Records; Catalogue: FLLP200/FLCD200	40
1993	More Songs From The Front Lawn	Label: Virgin Records; Catalogue: 4353032	15
"—" denotes a recording that did not chart or was not released in that territory.

=== Singles ===
Year	Title	Peak chart positions	Album
Year	Title	NZ	Album
1989	"When You Come Back Home"	49	Songs From The Front Lawn
1993	"The Beautiful Things"	22	More Songs From The Front Lawn
"—" denotes a recording that did not chart or was not released in that territory.

== Music videos ==
The Front Lawn produced music videos for their singles "When You Come Back Home" (1989) and "The Beautiful Things" (1993). In 1991, the Front Lawn was one of three artists given $5000 in the pilot scheme for NZ On Air's music video funding. This was for the production of "The Beautiful Things" video. Directed by Fane Flaws, the clip was nominated for Best Video at the 1994 New Zealand Music Awards and was the overall winner at the 1993 New Zealand Music Video Awards.

== Awards ==
Year	Nominee / work	Award	Result
1989	"Songs from The Front Lawn"	New Zealand Music Awards – Album of the Year	Nominated
1989	The Front Lawn	New Zealand Music Awards – Most Promising Group	Won
1989	The Front Lawn	New Zealand Music Awards – International Achievement	Won
1989	"Songs from The Front Lawn"	New Zealand Music Awards – Best Film Soundtrack/Compilation	Won
1990	Linda's Body (Harry Sinclair, The Front Lawn)	New Zealand Film Awards – Best Short Film	Won
1993	Fane Flaws "The Beautiful Things"	NZ Music Video Awards – Overall Winner	Won
1994	Fane Flaws "The Beautiful Things"	New Zealand Music Awards – Best Video	Nominated
