= Warm Hand =

Studio album by Don McGlashan
- Released: May 1, 2006
- Recorded: July 2004
- Studio: Te Papatipu, Bethell's Beach; Lab Studios; Platform Studios
- Genre: Rock
- Length: 52:13
- Label: Arch Hill Recordings
- Producer: Don McGlashan, Sean Donnelly and Edmund McWilliams

Don McGlashan chronology
Warm Hand (2006)	Marvellous Year (2009)

Warm Hand is the debut solo album by New Zealand songwriter Don McGlashan. Released in May 2006, it was a finalist for the 2006 New Zealand Music Awards' Album of the Year, while McGlashan was a finalist for Best Male Solo Artist for his work on the album. The live band that toured in support of the album, Don McGlashan and the Seven Sisters, comprised Sean James Donnelly (SJD), John Segovia, and Chris O'Connor.

The song "Toy Factory Fire" refers to the Kader Toy Factory Fire and "Miracle Sun" is about Opo the dolphin at Hokianga in 1955–6.

== Track listing ==
All tracks are written by Don McGlashan except where noted.

No.	Title	Length
1.	"This Is London"	5:03
2.	"Toy Factory Fire"	7:00
3.	"Blame"	5:41
4.	"Harbour Bridge"	3:44
5.	"Courier"	6:07
6.	"Passenger 26"	6:37
7.	"I Will Not Let You Down" (Sean Donnelly/SJD)	4:06
8.	"Interlude"	0:57
9.	"Miracle Sun"	7:02
10.	"Queen Of The Night"	5:55

== Personnel ==
- Don McGlashan – voice, guitars, ukulele, percussion
- Ross Burge — drums
- John Segovia — pedal steel, slide guitar
- Sean Donnelly — bass, backing vocals
- Tatiana Lanchtchikova — accordion
- Alan Norman — accordion
- Chris O'Connor: drums, piano ("This is London"), drums ("I Will Not Let You Down")
- Will Scott — drums ("Harbour Bridge")
- Miranda Adams — violin ("Miracle Sun")
- Mark Bell — guitar ("Harbour Bridge", "Courier")
- Graeme Humphreys — piano ("Harbour Bridge")
- Jason Smith — harmonium ("I Will Not Let You Down")
- Alan Pitts — saw ("Interlude")

== Compilation albums ==
- "Harbour Bridge"
  - Kiwi Hit Disc 92, NZ On Air, April 2007.
  - Now Hear This, The Word, No 49, March 2007 (UK).
- "I Will Not Let You Down"
  - Kiwi Hit Disc 87, NZ On Air, October 2006.
  - New Zealand New Music, IV, 2006 New Zealand Trade and Enterprise, 2006.
- "Miracle Sun"
  - Kiwi Hit Disc 81, NZ On Air, April 2006.
  - Music 4 Maui's - Songs To Save A Species, Various Artists, Music 4 Mauis, 15 June 2008.
    - The album was released to promote the plight of the endangered Māui dolphin. The tracks were donated free of charge.
- "This Is London"
  - Sounds of the Planet: Womad 2007, Filter Music, FM020, 2007.
- "Toy Factory Fire"
  - Nuclear Free Nation, Various Artists, Integrity Promotions New Zealand, 12 June 2007.

== Soundtracks ==
- "I Will Not Let You Down"
  - Out of the Blue, 2006.
  - The Tattooist, 2007.

== Award Nominations ==
- The first single, "Miracle Sun", was a nominee for the 2006 APRA Silver Scroll award, a songwriting award.
