= Dominion Road (song) =

Single by The Mutton Birds

from the album The Mutton Birds
- B-side: "White Valiant"
- Released: 1992
- Genre: Rock
- Length: 4:27
- Label: Virgin
- Songwriter(s): Don McGlashan
- Producer(s): The Mutton Birds

The Mutton Birds singles chronology
"Dominion Road" (1992)	"Nature" (1992)

"Dominion Road" is the debut single by New Zealand rock band The Mutton Birds. The song was released in 1992 as one of four singles to promote the band's debut self-titled album. Despite only spending ten weeks on the New Zealand singles charts and peaking at #31, the song has since become a New Zealand classic, being rated as the 23rd best New Zealand song of all time by the Australasian Performing Right Association in 2001. The song has resulted in the installation of a brass plaque in the footpath approximately half-way down the song's namesake street, in a reference to the song's lyrics.

Mutton Birds member Don McGlashan wrote the song after seeing a man from a bus window who, per McGlashan, "looked like he had been dealt some difficult hands in life". The song is an imagined backstory for this man and sees him occupying a halfway house on Dominion Road, with the song having been described as a "story of one man's suffering and ultimate salvation".

== Music video ==
Two videos were made for Dominion Road. The first of these was directed by Fane Flaws and filmed in New Zealand, mixing footage of the Mutton Birds performing the song in black and white with colourful footage of Dominion Road and the song's main character. An alternate video was later produced in the United Kingdom, featuring the band performing Dominion Road inside an old armoury building in London.

== Track listing ==
1. "Dominion Road" - 3:54
2. "White Valiant" - 5:12

== Legacy ==
Despite a lukewarm reception upon release, Dominion Road became a mainstay of 1990s New Zealand alternative rock, and helped contribute to the growing Auckland indie scene separate from the prevailing Dunedin sound. The song is regularly selected amongst lists of New Zealand's best rock music, appearing on compilations including Nature's Best, the Great New Zealand Songbook, and as part of an album supporting an Auckland Museum exhibition on music making in Aotearoa. The song's position on Nature's Best was a result of it being voted as the 23rd best New Zealand song of all time by the Australasian Performing Right Association in 2001, the highest ranked out of four Don McGlashan songs to appear in the top 100. Dominion Road has been covered by numerous New Zealand artists, including Dave Dobbyn, Nadia Reid and Towers.

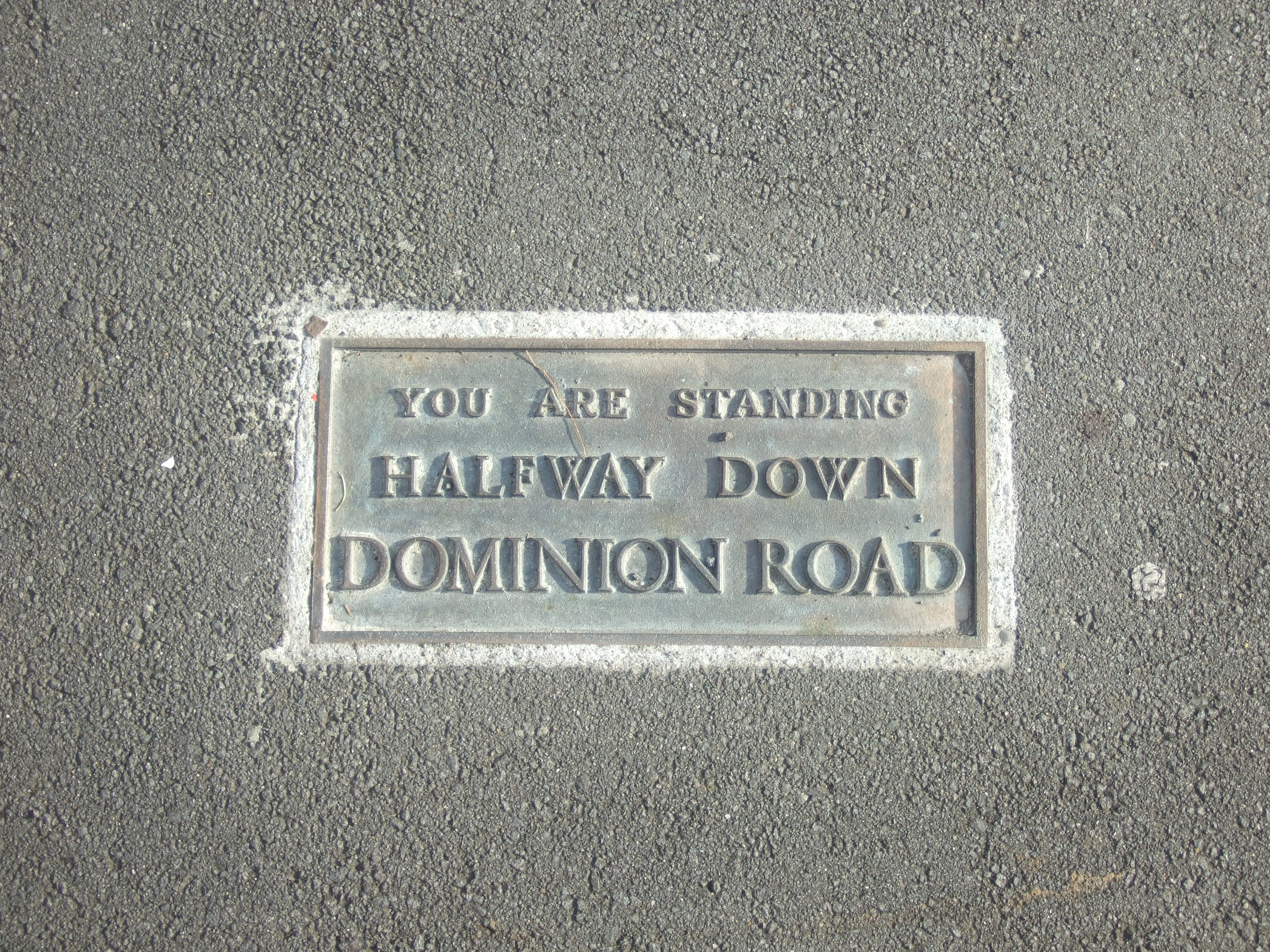
Unofficial Plaque marking halfway point along Dominion Road

In 2013, an unknown artist installed a brass plaque in the footpath approximately halfway down Dominion Road in honour of the song, in order to coincide with events on the street as part of the Auckland Arts Festival. However, changes to the road layout and discrepancies with the music video have led to debate as to where the halfway point described in the song actually is.

== Charts ==
Chart (1992)	Peak position
New Zealand (Recorded Music NZ)	31
