= Dribbling Darts =

New Zealand band

Dribbling Darts (formerly Dribbling Darts of Love)
- Origin: Auckland, New Zealand
- Years active: 1989–1993
- Past members: Matthew Bannister; Alice Bulmer; Ross Burge; Alan Gregg; Richard Foulkes Jr

Dribbling Darts (originally Dribbling Darts of Love) were a New Zealand band based in Auckland which existed from 1989 to 1993. The name is a quote from William Shakespeare, Measure for Measure, Act I, Scene III: "Believe not that the dribbling dart of love..." (may be a reference to Cupid).

The band were formed by Matthew Bannister when his move from Dunedin to Auckland led to the demise of his former band, the "Dunedin sound" group Sneaky Feelings. Other members of the Dribbling Darts of Love included Alice Bulmer, Ross Burge and Alan Gregg. They had a New Zealand Top 40 song with the offbeat "Hey Judith".

Richard Foulkes Jr. played drums on Florid Dabblers Voting (the title of which was an anagram of the band's name).

== Discography ==
Date of Release	Title	Label	Charted	Country	Catalog Number
Albums
1991	Florid Dabblers Voting/Shoot	Flying Nun Records	–	New Zealand	FN 213
1993	Present Perfect	Flying Nun Records	–	New Zealand	FN 247
2000	Present Perfect (reissue as a CD)		–	–	
EPs
1990	Shoot	Flying Nun Records	–	New Zealand	FN 161
–	Florid Dabblers Voting	Flying Nun Records	–	New Zealand	FN 197
Compilation DVD
2004	Very Short Films – Hey Judith	Flying Nun Records	–	New Zealand	FNDVD474

=== Singles ===
Year	Single	Album	Charted	Certification
1994	"Hey Judith"		–	–
