= Marshmallow (band) =

English bubblegum pop band

Marshmallow is a bubblegum pop band formed by Alan Gregg after leaving The Mutton Birds which is based in London, England.

== Members ==
The members of the band are Alan Gregg, Bert Thomas, Richard Turner and Cy Winstanley. The self-titled album Marshmallow was mainly a solo project but had contributions from other musicians such as David Long, Bic Runga and Ron Sexsmith.

== Discography ==
- Marshmallow - CD album (2003) (reissued 2005 with two extra songs)
- Anytime Soon - CD single (2004)
