= Chris Plummer (film editor) =

New Zealand film editor

Chris Plummer (born in Newton, Auckland) is a New Zealand film editor. He has worked on a number of films, including the shorts Sure to Rise and Possum, and feature films Channelling Baby, In My Father's Den, Black Sheep, No.2, Vincent Ward's documentary Rain of the Children, and Taika Waititi's Boy.

== Education ==
He studied communications at the University of Technology, Sydney and spent time at Auckland filmmakers' co-operative Alternative Cinema.

== Career ==
In 1986, he began working as an editor at TVNZ, a government television news agency in New Zealand. In 1994, he worked with director Bill Saunders on his documentary, Everybody Hurts.

Plummer won New Zealand Screen Awards for editing for the 2004 film In My Father's Den and the 2008 film Dean Spanley.

In 2005, No. 2, which Plummer edited, was a Robert Redford Festival Pick at Sundance.

In 2010, Plummer won Best Editing in a Feature Film by Qantas Film Awards for his work on Boy.
