= No. 2 (film) =

2006 film by Toa Fraser

- Directed by: Toa Fraser
- Written by: Toa Fraser
- Produced by: Tim Bevan; Philippa Campbell; Timothy White
- Starring: Ruby Dee; Mia Blake; Tuva Novotny
- Cinematography: Leon Narbey
- Edited by: Chris Plummer
- Music by: Don McGlashan
- Production companies: Colonial Encounters; Southern Light Films
- Distributed by: Miramax Films (through Buena Vista International)
- Release dates: 20 January 2006 (Sundance Film Festival); 16 February 2006 (New Zealand)
- Running time: 94 minutes
- Language: English

No. 2, released as Naming Number Two in North America, is a 2006 New Zealand film written and directed by Toa Fraser in his feature film debut. It was released 16 February 2006 in New Zealand and 3 August 2007 in the U.S. It was adapted from New Zealand-Fijian playwright Fraser's 2000 play.

== Plot ==
Nanna Maria, the matriarch of a Fijian extended family living in a suburb of Auckland, New Zealand, feels that the heart and passion has gone out of her clan. One morning, she demands that her grown grandchildren put on a big family feast at which she will name her successor. The grandchildren—Soul, Charlene, Hibiscus, Erasmus, and her favorite, Tyson—reluctantly turn up, Tyson with his new Danish girlfriend, Maria. Family conflicts play out as the difficult day progresses, but in the end the grandchildren—and eventually Nanna's children too—join with cousins and others in a traditional celebration.

== Cast ==
Actor	Role
Ruby Dee	Nanna Maria
Taungaroa Emile	Soul
Rene Naufahu	Erasmus
Tuva Novotny	Danish Maria
Mia Blake	Charlene
Xavier Horan	Tyson
Miriama McDowell	Hibiscus
Nathaniel Lees	Uncle John
Joe Folau	pule
Tanea Heke	Aunty Cat
Pio Terei	Uncle Percy
Te Paki Cherrington	Father Francis
Antony Starr	Shelly

== Production ==
No. 2 was co-produced by Tim White, Tim Bevan, and Philippa Campbell. The production companies were Colonial Encounters and Southern Light Films.

Leon Narbey was cinematographer, Chris Plummer edited the film, and the music was composed by Don McGlashan. The soundtrack was released as No. 2: Original Motion Picture Soundtrack.

The film was shot in the Auckland, New Zealand, suburb of Mount Roskill during the latter part of summer 2005, with interior scenes of Nanna Maria's house taking place on a soundstage at Henderson Valley Studios. Post-production was completed in Wellington, at Park Road Post.

Soon after the arrival of Ruby Dee in New Zealand, the film was put on hold after the news that her husband Ossie Davis had died in the U.S. Dee flew back to attend the funeral. However, before she left New Zealand, she vowed to return and complete the film. The crew were stood down for a three-week period, and principal photography commenced at the beginning of March 2005.

== Release ==
The film was distributed by Miramax Films, through Buena Vista International.

== Awards ==
- 2006 Sundance Film Festival World Cinema Audience Award: Dramatic
- Nomination, 2006 Sundance Film Festival Grand Jury Prize
