= The Starlings =

English rock band

- Origin: London, England
- Genre: Alternative rock
- Years active: 1989–1994
- Labels: Bad Girl Records, Anxious, Atlantic
- Past members: Chris Sheehan; Barry Blackler; Matt Parkin

The Starlings were an English alternative rock band, formed in 1989, utilised as the main project for New Zealand-born singer/guitarist Chris Sheehan. The group was dissolved by Sheehan around the release of their last EP. Sheehan went on to record two LPs under the name Starlings as the only member and producer/engineer.

== History ==
Chris Sheehan (26 June 1965 – 18 December 2014) was born in Palmerston North. Sheehan had been a teenage star in his native New Zealand, playing guitar in the new wave band The Dance Exponents between 1983 and the late 1980s. When the group split up he moved to Los Angeles, and guested on the debut solo album by Jane Wiedlin. He also played guitar on Curve's debut EP in 1990. Initially a five-piece band, Sheehan sacked all original Starlings members other than drummer and fellow New Zealander Barry Blackler and recruited Northampton-born bass guitarist Matt Parkin. The band were likened to The Jesus and Mary Chain, and supported Curve on their tour of the UK and Ireland in 1991. After their first EP, the band signed to Dave Stewart's Anxious Records. The band's debut album Valid was released in 1992, the songs documenting Sheehan's withdrawal from heroin, followed two years later by Too Many Dogs, with songs described as "vicious, dark, misanthropic gems", the latter released in the United States by Atlantic Records, and attracting critical acclaim if not commercial success. Contractual difficulties had led the band to split up in 1991 shortly before the recording of Valid. Parkin and Blackler had also acted as the rhythm section for The Jesus and Mary Chain between 1991 and 1992.

Sheehan played with Babylon Zoo, and The Mutton Birds in the latter half of the 1990s and returned with a solo album, Planet Painkiller in 2000, under the name Chris Starling. In 2002 the album Sounds like... Chris Starling was released by Popchild records. He joined The Sisters of Mercy as rhythm guitarist later that year, although he subsequently left the band.

In July 2013, Sheehan announced through Fundrazr that he was suffering from incurable cancer (Stage 4 metastatic nodular melanoma). He died on 18 December 2014.

== Discography ==
=== Singles ===
- A Letter From Heaven EP (1990), Bad Girl
- "Try" (1991) Anxious
- Safe in Heaven Dead EP (1991), Anxious
- "The Last One" (1991) Anxious
- Loch Angeles Monster EP (1994), Anxious
- "Tears Before Bedtime" (1994), Anxious/Atlantic

Chris Starling

- "Rawhide Baby" (1999), EX34
- "The Word" (1999), EX34

=== Albums ===
- Valid (1992), Anxious
- Too Many Dogs (1994), Anxious/Atlantic
- Out of the Woods (1995) – unreleased, subsequently re-recorded and reissued by Chris Sheehan

Chris Starling

- Planet Painkiller (2000), EX34
- Sounds Like... (2002), EX34
