= Hollie Smith =

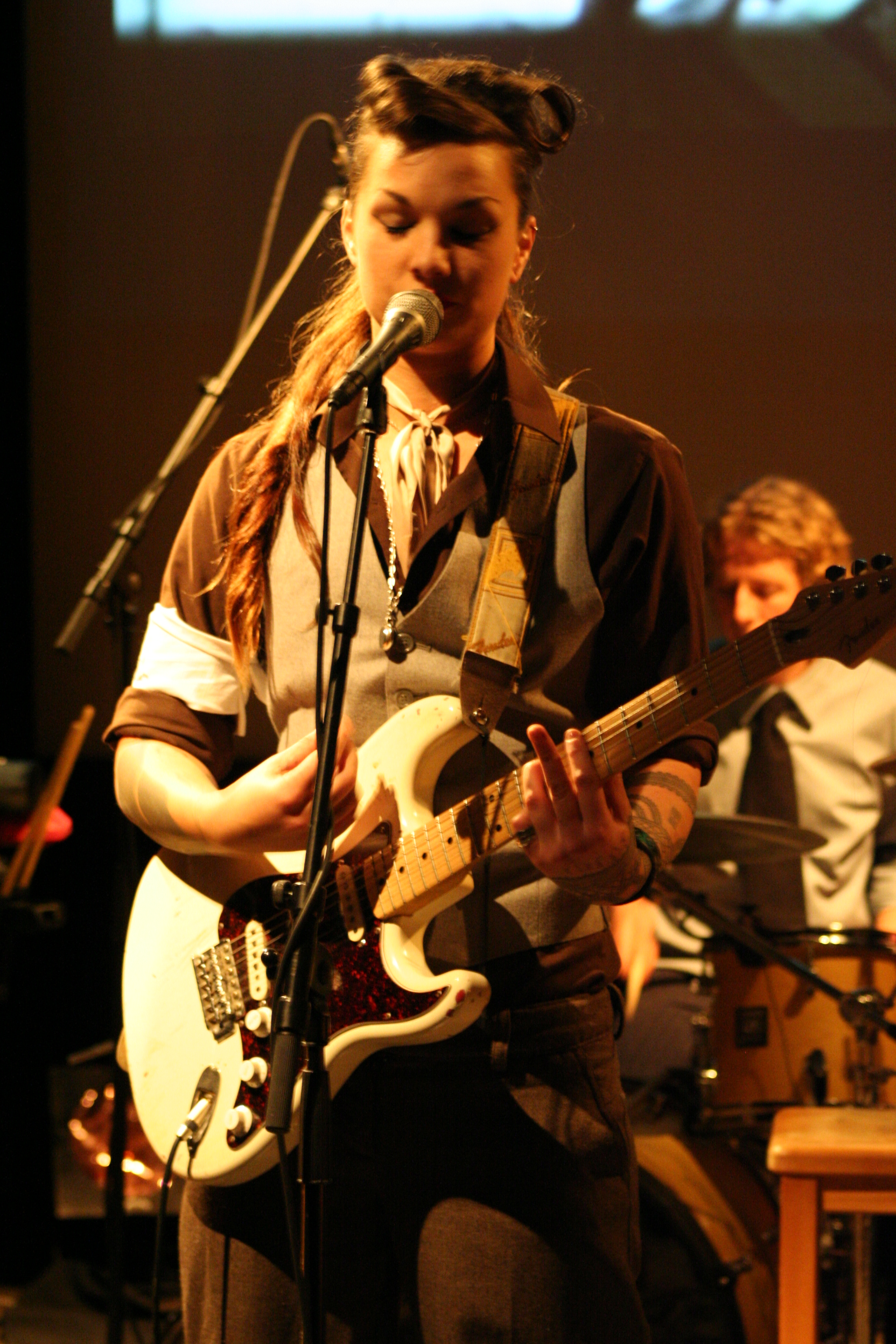

Background information
- Born: 17 November 1982 (age 44); Auckland, New Zealand
- Genres: Soul, blues, jazz
- Instruments: Vocals, guitar, piano
- Years active: 1999–present
- Labels: Soundsmith Records; EMI Records (NZ); Manhattan Records; Warner Music Group (NZ)
- Website: holliesmith.co.nz

Hollie Smith (born 17 November 1982) is a New Zealand soul singer-songwriter based in Auckland. Her four solo albums Long Player, Humour and the Misfortune of Others, Water or Gold, and Coming In From The Dark have all reached number one on the RIANZ albums chart.

== Early years ==
Smith attended Auckland's Willow Park Primary School, Takapuna Normal Intermediate and Northcote College. In 1999, as a 16-year-old, Smith made the album Light From a Distant Shore after winning Best Female Vocalist at the National Jazz Festival of NZ. This album of Celtic music was produced by her stepfather, Steve McDonald. One of these early songs with McDonald, featuring Smith, would eventually be sampled for a track by US rap artist DMX for his album Year Of The Dog... Again.

== Career ==
In 2003, Smith moved to Wellington singing with TrinityRoots. She recorded an album Home, Land and Sea and toured with the band. She also featured on Fat Freddy’s Drop's track ‘Hope’ and performed on Concord Dawn and Recloose’ albums. In 2005, the 5-track Hollie Smith EP was released, featuring her own compositions. In 2005, the single "Bathe in the River", written by Don McGlashan and featuring Smith, was released. The song, from the soundtrack of the New Zealand feature film, No. 2, was a significant hit, spending 22 weeks in the NZ Top 10 and went on to win the APRA Silver Scroll.

In 2005, Smith signed a multi-album record deal with Manhattan Records, part of the Blue Note Label Group. Hollie would then record in New York City with producer and keyboard legend James Poyser (The Roots), Adam Blackstone (Kanye West, Justin Timberlake) and Jeff Lee Johnson (Erykah Badu, Aretha Franklin). The deal then collapsed upon the sale of Manhattan Records/EMI to Universal, which forced the singer to use the profits of her first album release, Long Player, released in 2006, debuting at #1 and going on to sell Gold, to get out of the deal with Blue Note. During this time she opened for artists Bob Dylan and Coldplay on the New Zealand legs of their tours.

After a forced two-year absence from the music industry, Smith released the album Humour and the Misfortune of Others on 15 March 2010, and would debut at #1 and become certified gold. She followed this soon after with the "Hollie and The Last S.O.S Tour" in New Zealand.

2011 saw the release of a collaborative album Smith produced with Electric Wire Hustle member Mara TK titled "Band of Brothers Vol. 1", which received a 4 star review from the NZ Herald's Russell Baillie, describing it as "a sideways step but still highly approachable".

In 2012, Smith, with fellow singer/songwriters Anika Moa and Boh Runga, embarked on a sold-out national acoustic church tour of New Zealand. Later that year Smith, Moa, and Runga starred in an online video campaign supporting gay marriage, alongside Olympian Danyon Loader and former Governor-General Dame Catherine Tizard.

In 2013 Smith, Moa, and Runga released a collaborative album titled "Anika Boh Hollie". Following this they embarked on a national tour of concerts at wineries around New Zealand with the internationally acclaimed New Zealand group Fat Freddy's Drop.

Later in 2013, Smith was selected to perform at the Australasian World Music Expo in Melbourne, which resulted in an invitation to perform at the prestigious Montreal Jazz Festival in July 2014. There, she headlined her stage with her band as part of the Les Soirees jazzy series of free outdoor concerts, performing two concurrent sets in front of an estimated audience of over 50,000. Reviewer Sharonne Cohen from US jazz magazine JazzTimes went on to describe how Smith's "...powerhouse outdoor performance captivated thousands". From there Smith's northern hemisphere tour continued with a concert in New York at the Rockwood Music Hall and further concerts throughout UK/Europe including several for the New Zealand Commonwealth Games team in Glasgow.

In July 2015, Smith signed a deal with Warner Music NZ and then in September of that year released the single "Lady Dee", followed by the 2016 release of her album "Water Or Gold", which would debut at #1 on the NZ Top 40 Albums Chart, and see New Zealand Music Award nominations for 'Album of the Year' and 'Best Female Solo Artist'. In 2016, Smith completed two tours of New Zealand and a tour of Australia to promote the release of the album.

In 2019, her bilingual collaboration with Teeks, ‘Whakaaria Mai/How Great Thou Art’ received widespread acclaim and would see her perform it at a concert in remembrance of the Christchurch terrorist attack victims. Hollie then guested on the 2020 COVID-19 lockdown hit ‘Stay’ with an all-star line up that featured Stan Walker, Ria Hall, Kings, Troy Kingi, among others. In early 2021 Smith worked alongside Don McGlashan again for the TVNZ series Waiata Anthems, on an episode that documented the making of a bilingual te reo Māori version of ‘Bathe In the River’, titled ‘Korukutia’.

In October 2021, five years after the release of Water Or Gold, Smith returned with her fourth solo album, Coming In From The Dark. An album which saw her collaborating with some of New Zealand’s top musicians, including the New Zealand Symphony Orchestra, TEEKS, Sole Mio and Raiza Biza. Upon release, the album debuted at #1 on the NZ Top 40 Albums chart, making it the fourth number one for Smith.

In October 2022, Smith won the second season of the Masked Singer NZ, as 'Bedazzled Unicorn'.

== Personal life ==
In 2010, Smith ended an "intense" relationship with C4 presenter Clarke Gayford.

== Discography ==
=== Studio albums ===
Year	Title	Details	Peak chart positions	Certifications
Year	Title	Details	NZ	Certifications
1999	Light From a Distant Shore	Label: Etherean	—	
2007	Long Player	Released: 28 May 2007; Label: Soundsmith/EMI	1	RMNZ: 2× Platinum
2010	Humour and the Misfortune of Others	Released: 15 March 2010; Label: Soundsmith/EMI	1	RMNZ: Gold
2011	Band of Brothers Vol. 1 (Hollie Smith and Mara TK)	Released: 1 August 2011; Label: Soundsmith	8	
2013	Peace of Mind (Anika, Boh & Hollie)	Released: 1 February 2013; Label: Civic/Sony	2	
2016	Water or Gold	Released: 1 April 2016; Label: Soundsmith/Warner	1	
2021	Coming in from the Dark	Released: 22 October 2021; Label: Soundsmith/Warner	1	

=== As featured artist ===
- Home, Land and Sea (2004) Trinity Roots
- Hiatus on the Horizon (2005) Recloose
- Chaos by Design (2006) Concord Dawn
- Steps in Time (2006) Solaa
- Based on a True Story (2007) Fat Freddy's Drop

=== EPs ===
Year	Title	Details	Peak chart positions
Year	Title	Details	NZ
2006	Hollie Smith	Released: 2006	18

=== Singles ===
Year	Title	Peak chart positions	Album
Year	Title	NZ	Album
2006	"Bathe in the River" (Mt Raskil Preservation Society featuring Hollie Smith)	2	Non-album single
2008	"Sensitive to a Smile"	33	Lights of the Pacific: The Very Best of Herbs
2015	"Team, Ball, Player, Thing" (#KiwisCureBatten featuring Lorde, Kimbra, Brooke Fraser, et al.)	2	Non-album single
2015	"Lady Dee"	—	Water or Gold
2016	"Helena"	—	Water or Gold
2016	"Lead the Way"	—	Water or Gold
2016	"Water or Gold"	—	Water or Gold
2016	"Please" (New Zealand White Ribbon Campaign)	—	Non-album single

== Awards ==
Year	Nominee / work	Award	Result
1996	Hollie Smith	Tauranga Jazz Festival – Best Vocalist	Won
2007	Long Player	New Zealand Music Awards – Album of the Year	Nominated
2007	Hollie Smith – Long Player	New Zealand Music Awards – Best Female Solo Artist	Won
2007	Hollie Smith – Long Player	New Zealand Music Awards – Breakthrough Artist of the Year	Won
2007	Hollie Smith	New Zealand Music Awards – Best Aotearoa Roots Album	Won
2007	Jeremy Toy & Hollie Smith – Long Player (Hollie Smith)	New Zealand Music Awards – Best Producer	Won
2010	Hollie Smith – Humour and the Misfortune of Others	New Zealand Music Awards – Best Female Artist	Nominated
2010	Hollie Smith – Humour and the Misfortune of Others	New Zealand Music Awards – Best Aotearoa Roots Album	Nominated
2012	Hollie Smith – Band of Brothers Vol.1 (Hollie Smith & Mara TK)	New Zealand Music Awards – Best Roots Album	Nominated
2016	Hollie Smith – Water Or Gold (Hollie Smith)	New Zealand Music Awards – Best Album	Nominated
2016	Hollie Smith – Water Or Gold (Hollie Smith)	New Zealand Music Awards – Best Female Vocalist	Nominated
