= The Mutton Birds =

New Zealand rock music group

- Origin: Auckland, New Zealand
- Genres: Rock
- Years active: 1991–2002, 2012
- Labels: EMI; Virgin; Gravy Train; shhh!
- Past members: David Long; Don McGlashan; Ross Burge; Alan Gregg; Chris Sheehan; Tony Fisher; Andrew Claridge; Matthew Bannister

The Mutton Birds were a New Zealand rock music group formed in Auckland in 1991 by Ross Burge, David Long and Don McGlashan, with Alan Gregg joining a year later. Four of their albums reached the top 10 on the New Zealand Albums Chart, The Mutton Birds (1992), Salty (1994), Envy of Angels (1996) and Rain, Steam and Speed (1999). They had a number-one hit with "The Heater" (1994), while their two other top 10 singles were a cover of "Nature" by the Fourmyula (1992), and an original, "Anchor Me" (1994). From 1996 to 2000 the group were based in England; they returned to New Zealand and then disbanded in 2002.

== History ==
David Long on guitars and Don McGlashan on lead vocals and bass guitar formed the Mutton Birds in Auckland as a three-piece rock group in early 1991. For their first live performance, on Saint Patrick's Day, they used an interim drummer who was soon replaced by Ross Burge. McGlashan had been a member of Blam Blam Blam (1982, 1984) and the Front Lawn (1985–1993), Long had played in the Six Volts and appeared on the Front Lawn's albums. Burge had been a member of the Spines and Sneaky Feelings, and early on, he was drumming both for Dribbling Darts (1989–1993) and the Mutton Birds. In 1992, the three-piece band gained Alan Gregg, also from Dribbling Darts, on bass guitar.

As a four-piece they recorded their first self-titled album. It peaked at No. 2 on the New Zealand Albums Chart in September 1992, and was certified platinum in New Zealand. It was in the top 50 for 52 non-consecutive weeks. They gained notice outside college radio for their cover version of "Nature" (August 1992), which reached No. 4 on the related singles chart. The original was recorded by the Fourmyula in 1969 (written by keyboardist Wayne Mason), and in 2001 was voted as New Zealand's greatest song of the previous 75 years.

They signed with EMI Australia, which financed their second studio album, Salty (April 1994). This was self-produced and mixed by American producer-engineer Tchad Blake (Elvis Costello, Tom Waits, Crowded House). It reached No. 3 and was certified platinum in New Zealand. Salty provided a number-one hit single, "The Heater", in April, and top 10 position for "Anchor Me" (October). McGlashan won an APRA Silver Scroll song writing award for the latter hit. Their next album, Nature (September 1995), was a compilation of tracks selected from their first two albums with additional production by Neil Finn (of Crowded House), via Virgin Records for the United Kingdom market.

Their third studio album, Envy of Angels, was recorded in Wales and released in November 1996, with Hugh Jones producing (the Bluetones, Dodgy, Echo and the Bunnymen). It peaked at No. 4 in New Zealand. The band moved to London where they remained until 2000. During 1996 the Mutton Birds contributed a cover version of Blue Öyster Cult's 1976 single, "(Don't Fear) The Reaper", to the soundtrack of Peter Jackson's film The Frighteners. Their version reached the ARIA Singles Chart top 50 early in the following year. By that time Long had already returned to New Zealand and he was replaced on guitar by New Zealand-born, British-based Chris Sheehan (of the Starlings).

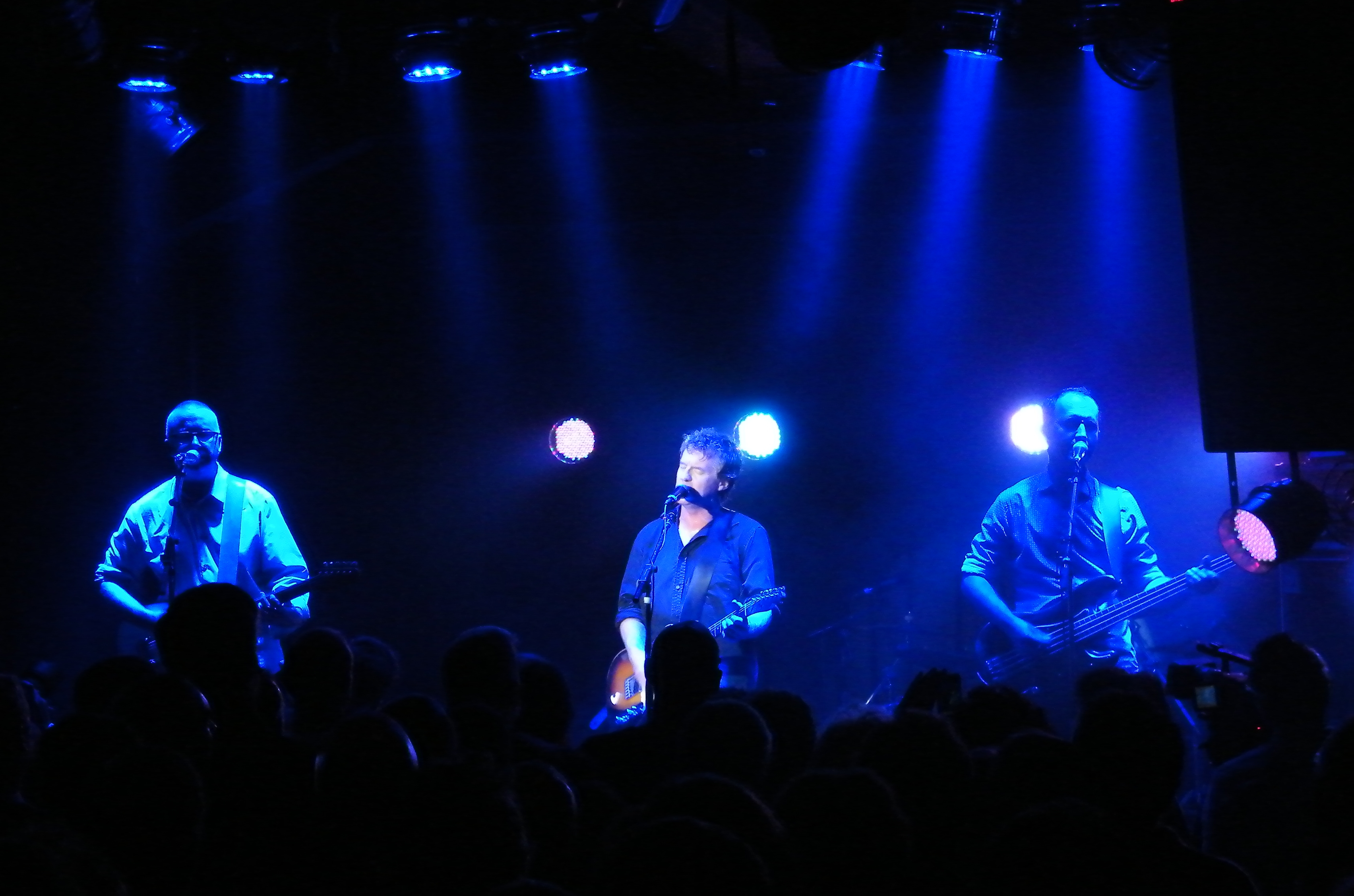
The Mutton Birds performing at Bar Bodega, Wellington, 2012

In 1997 the band played concerts in Canada as part of the Another Roadside Attraction festival tour. They established their own label, Gravy Train Records, and issued two limited-release albums, Angle of Entry (an acoustic live album) in late 1997 and Too Hard Basket (subtitled B-sides and Bastards, a compilation of contained rarities) in 1998. In mid-1998 Gregg left and was replaced by English-born Tony Fisher on bass guitar and keyboards. The group's fourth studio album, Rain, Steam and Speed (February 1999), appeared on shhh! Records. Another live album, Live in Manchester, was issued before their 2000 UK tour, during which their line-up was augmented by ex-Garageland guitarist, Andrew Claridge.

For the New Zealand and Australian tour in October–November 1999, Burge's former band mate Matthew Bannister (Sneaky Feelings, Dribbling Darts) was added to the line-up. The group returned to New Zealand in 2000. A greatest hits compilation, Flock, was released in 2002 but they disbanded by mid-year. In 2012 the Mutton Birds temporarily reunited with the line-up of Burge, Gregg, Long and McGlashan, to play at New Zealand wineries in February and early March. Another live album from that tour, Free Range: The Mutton Birds Live 2012, was issued in November.

== Discography ==
=== Albums ===
Year	Title	Details	Peak chart positions		
Year	Title	Details	NZ	AUS	UK
1992	The Mutton Birds	Label: Bag (EMI); Catalogue: 8282612	2	—	—
1994	Salty	Label: Virgin Records; Catalogue: 839 4882	3	—	—
1995	Nature	Label: Virgin Records; Catalogue: CDVIRDJ39	—	—	—
1996	Envy of Angels	Label: EMI; Catalogue: 8425842	4	59	64
1997	Angle of Entry	Label: Gravy Train Records; Catalogue: GRAVY CD1	—	—	—
1997	Too Hard Basket	Label: Catalogue: GRAVY CD2	—	—	—
1999	Rain, Steam and Speed	Label: Shhh! Records/Virgin Records; Catalogue: SHCDA 001/8473332	10	—	—
2000	Live in Manchester	Label: Shhh! Records	—	—	—
2002	Flock: The Best of the Mutton Birds	Label: EMI	30	—	—
2012	Free Range: The Mutton Birds Live 2012	Label: RNZ	—	—	—

=== Singles ===
Year	Title	Peak chart positions			Album
Year	Title	NZ	AUS	UK	Album
1992	"Dominion Road"	31	—	—	The Mutton Birds
1992	"Nature"	4	—	—	The Mutton Birds
1992	"Giant Friend"	20	—	—	The Mutton Birds
1993	"Your Window"	19	—	—	The Mutton Birds
1994	"The Heater"	1	—	—	Salty
1994	"In My Room"	14	—	—	Salty
1994	"Ngaire"	19	—	—	Salty
1994	"Anchor Me"	10	—	—	Salty
1996	"She's Been Talking"	19	—	100	Envy of Angels
1997	"Come Around"	35	—	81	Envy of Angels
1997	"April"	—	—	—	Envy of Angels
1997	"(Don't Fear) The Reaper"	—	48	—	The Frighteners soundtrack
1999	"Pulled Along By Love"	—	—	—	Rain, Steam, and Speed
"—" denotes a recording that did not chart or was not released in that territory.

== Awards ==
=== Aotearoa Music Awards ===
The Aotearoa Music Awards (previously known as New Zealand Music Awards (NZMA)) are an annual awards night celebrating excellence in New Zealand music and have been presented annually since 1965.

Year	Nominee / work	Award	Result	Ref.
1993	The Mutton Birds	Album of the Year	Won	
1993	The Mutton Birds	Group of the Year	Won	
1993	Nature	Single of the Year	Won	
1993	Fane Flaws & The Mutton Birds/ Sycorax Films for "Nature" by The Mutton Birds	Music Video of the Year	Nominated	
1995	Salty	Album of the Year	Nominated	
1995	The Mutton Birds	Group of the Year	Nominated	
1996	The Mutton Birds	Group of the Year	Nominated	
1997	Envy of Angels	Album of the Year	Nominated	
1997	The Mutton Birds	Group of the Year	Nominated	
1997	The Mutton Birds	Single of the Year	Nominated	
1998	The Mutton Birds	International Achievement	Nominated	
1998	The Mutton Birds	Group of the Year	Nominated	
2000	Rain, Steam & Speed	Album of the Year	Nominated	
2000	"Pulled Along By Love"	Single of the Year	Nominated	
2000	Don McGlashan (The Mutton Birds)	Male Vocalist of the Year	Nominated	
2000	Sam Gibson for "Rain Steam & Speed" by The Mutton Birds	Engineer of the Year	Nominated	
2003	Campbell Hooper-Johnson for Flock: The Best of The Mutton Birds	Album Cover of the Year	Won	

== Bibliography ==
- Dix, John, Stranded In Paradise, Penguin, 2005. ISBN 0-14-301953-8
- Eggleton, David, Ready To Fly, Craig Potton, 2003. ISBN 1-877333-06-9
- Shute, Gareth, NZ Rock 1987–2007, Auckland, Random House, 2008. ISBN 978-1-86979-000-4
- Spittle, Gordon, Counting The Beat, GP Publications, 1997. ISBN 1-86956-213-5
