= Ross Burge =

New Zealand musician

Ross Elliott Burge is a New Zealand musician, who started playing drums with the Nelson College rock band Mandias in 1973. He decided that this was to be the life for him, and called the NZPO to ensure back-up. He has since played drums for bands and artists such as, and in roughly chronological order:- Andy Anderson's express, Rodger Fox Big Band, Sharon O'Neill, Jon Stevens, The Scouts, Two Armed Men (with Wayne Mason and Jonathan Crayford), Spines, Sneaky Feelings, Dribbling Darts, The Happ'ng Thang (Australia), The Mutton Birds, Bic Runga, Rick Bryant, Windy City Strugglers, Tim Finn, The Finn Brothers, Dave Dobbyn and Anika Moa.Hamish Gunn [ guitar and vocals in Mandias, Golden Horn Sound Company Band sponsored “Lady and BackBone” ].

== Bands, Sessions etc. ==
- Sami Sisters 2011??
- Bleeding Allstars, Up Roses (1999) (Songs of David Pine) (ex-Sneaky Feelings)
- (Rick Bryant) 2011???
- Dave Dobbyn, Twist, (1994); Available Light (2005); Another Land (2009)
- Dribbling Darts of Love (c1992)
- Finn Brothers, Everyone Is Here (2004 demo's)
- Marshmallow, Marshmallow (2002)
- Wayne Mason, Between Frames (1995)
- Don McGlashan, Warm Hand (2006)
- The Mutton Birds (1991–2002)
- Netherworld Dancing Toys – 'For Today'
- Sharon O'Neill – first album
- Rodger Fox Big Band
- Bic Runga, You Don't Want To Know (B-side to Get Some Sleep) (2002)
- Barry Saunders, Red Morning (2002)
- Sneaky Feelings (1988)
- The Spines

Country Calendar (TV Theme)

- The Stereo Bus, The Stereo Bus (1997)
- Windy City Strugglers tour, (2003) and Kingfisher CD (2004)

== Soundtracks ==
- Perfect Strangers (2003)

== Stage ==
- Feedback – musical by Toa Fraser and Tim Finn (2002)
