= Don McGlashan =

New Zealand musician, songwriter, composer

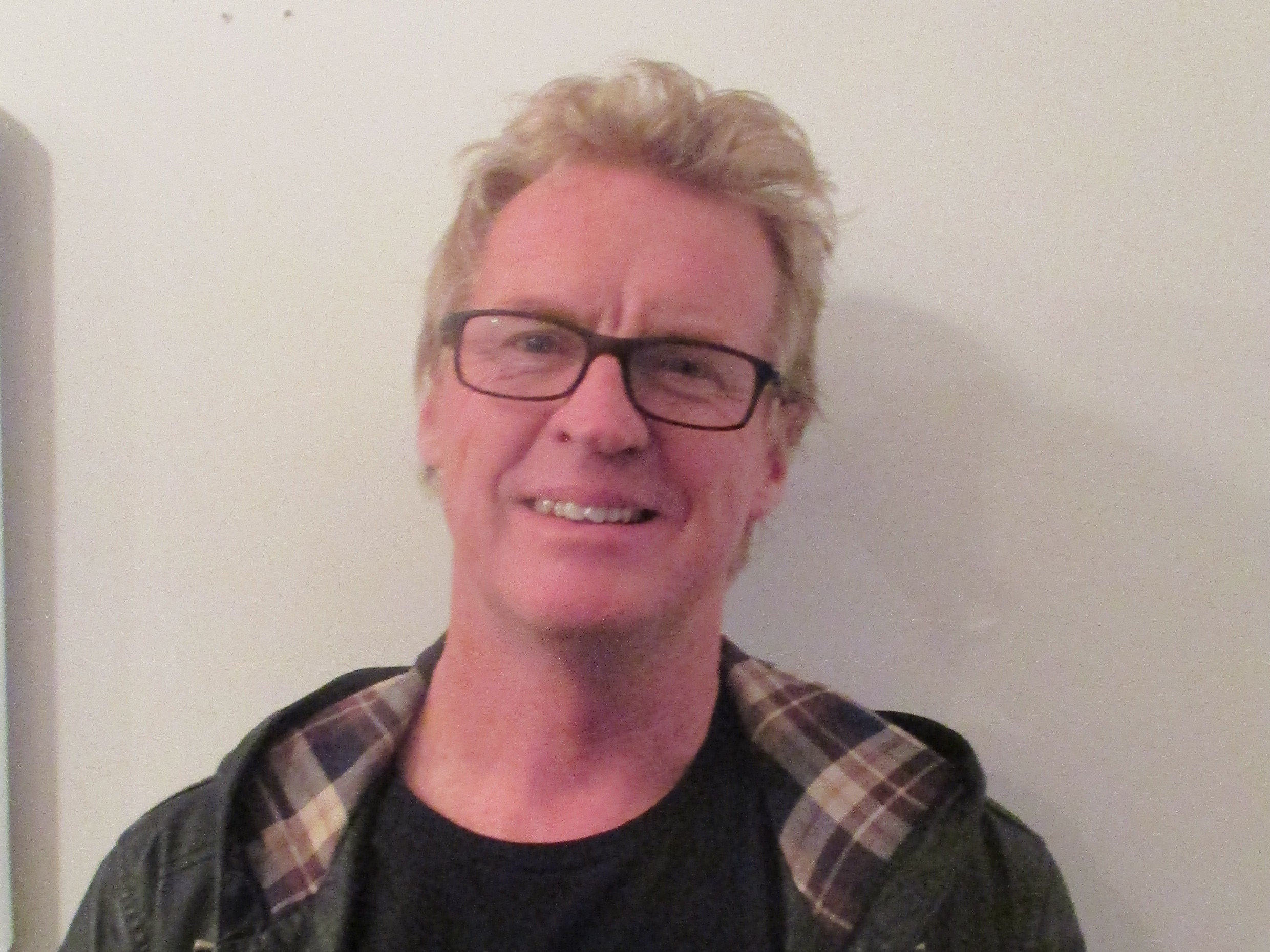
- McGlashan at the Raglan Club in 2015

Background information
- Born: Donald McGlashan; 18 July 1959 (age 67); Auckland, New Zealand
- Occupations: Musician, songwriter, multi-instrumentalist, composer
- Instruments: Vocals, euphonium, piano, guitar, drums, percussion
- Years active: 1979–present
- Label: Arch Hill
- Website: www.donmcglashan.com

Don McGlashan (born 18 July 1959) is a New Zealand composer, singer and multi-instrumentalist who is best known for membership in the bands Blam Blam Blam, The Front Lawn, and The Mutton Birds, before going solo. He has also composed for cinema and television.

McGlashan was also a member of Philip Dadson's percussion group From Scratch, and bands The Bellbirds, The Plague, and composed pieces for New Zealand's Limbs Dance Company. His first hits were with band Blam Blam Blam in the early 1980s. He later released four albums as lead singer and writer for The Mutton Birds.

He was a 2023 inductee to the New Zealand Music Hall of Fame.

== Early life ==
McGlashan was born in Auckland, New Zealand. Both his parents were teachers: his father Bain taught civil engineering at the Auckland Technical Institute and his mother Alice was a schoolteacher. McGlashan was actively encouraged to pursue music from a young age by his father, who bought him various musical instruments to learn on. McGlashan wrote "Envy of Angels" as a tribute to his father. At age seven McGlashan began on cello and piano, "then gradually added more instruments to that. [I] went through the tune-a-day for whatever instrument it was, for just about every instrument I think."

McGlashan attended Westlake Boys' High School, on Auckland's North Shore. While at high school he began playing keyboard in local bands. "I carried on sort of following those two strands – of learning how to write songs, learning how to be in a band, learning all the sort of extra musical stuff that you have to learn – and on the other side I was learning the French horn."

At the University of Auckland, McGlashan studied English and music, and played French horn and percussion in the Auckland Symphonia (later called the Auckland Philharmonia) from 1979 to 1982. McGlashan began working with Philip Dadson's percussion group From Scratch in 1979, while playing in the Auckland Symphonia. McGlashan played a number of eclectic percussion instruments, such as the thongophone (PVC piping struck with jandals); the name of the group came from the fact that they produced their own instruments 'from scratch'. On Standards, the album he jointly produced with Ivan Zagni for Propeller Records in 1982, he is credited as playing bass guitar, horn, whistle, percussion, marimba and vocals.

== Career ==
=== 1981–1984: Blam Blam Blam ===
In 1981, McGlashan replaced Ian Gilroy in punk band The Whizz Kids, who rechristened themselves Blam Blam Blam. McGlashan's song "Don't Fight It Marsha, It's Bigger Than Both of Us" reached #17 in the New Zealand charts. Local music magazine Rip It Up deemed it 'best single of the year', and readers voted McGlashan drummer of the year.

=== 1985–1990: The Front Lawn ===
In March 1985, a group formed for the purpose, Left, Right and Centre, released a single, "Don't Go", a protest against the proposed All Blacks tour of South Africa. The song was written by Don McGlashan, Frank Stark and Geoff Chapple. McGlashan, Chris Knox and Rick Bryant were the main vocalists.

McGlashan formed multi-media group The Front Lawn with Harry Sinclair. The duo (in their late stages a trio, thanks to the addition of actor Jennifer Ward-Lealand) won acclaim for theatre shows which combined music with physical comedy. McGlashan's song "Andy", written in memory of his late brother, was later listed among the APRA Top 100 New Zealand Songs of All Time.

McGlashan and Sinclair also made and starred in short films Walk Short (in which each played multiple roles), The Lounge Bar and 1990's Linda's Body. By now Sinclair was growing increasingly interested in directing, while McGlashan was keen to return to the live circuit. He had also begun composing for the screen.

=== 1991–2002: The Mutton Birds ===
David Long moved from Wellington to Auckland to work with McGlashan, and the two began working together and auditioning drummers. After playing their first gig on St Patrick's Day 1991 with a session drummer, Steve Garden, they heard about Ross Burge and convinced him to move back to New Zealand from New York to join The Mutton Birds. The band began to become successful—"Anchor Me" won McGlashan the 1994 Silver Scroll Award—and later moved to the UK. However, while the Mutton Birds received acclaim from UK critics and music magazines, they failed to achieve mainstream success. Eventually they disbanded, and McGlashan returned to New Zealand.

=== 2003–present: Solo work ===
McGlashan's first solo album, Warm Hand, was released in May 2006. It was nominated for an NZ Music Award for album of the year, and debut single "Miracle Sun" was a nominee for New Zealand's supreme songwriting award, the APRA Silver Scroll.

In March 2009, the album Marvellous Year was released through Arch Hill Records. The album is credited to Don McGlashan & the Seven Sisters, a band which had begun when he toured Warm Hand. The album included a new version of McGlashan-penned hit "Bathe in the River", with McGlashan on lead vocals.

In 2005, "Anchor Me" was re-recorded by an ensemble of NZ artists to commemorate the 20th anniversary of the Rainbow Warrior bombing.

In 2012 McGlashan was one of a select number of artists given permission to visit Antarctica. The following year he was awarded the two-month Michael King residency.

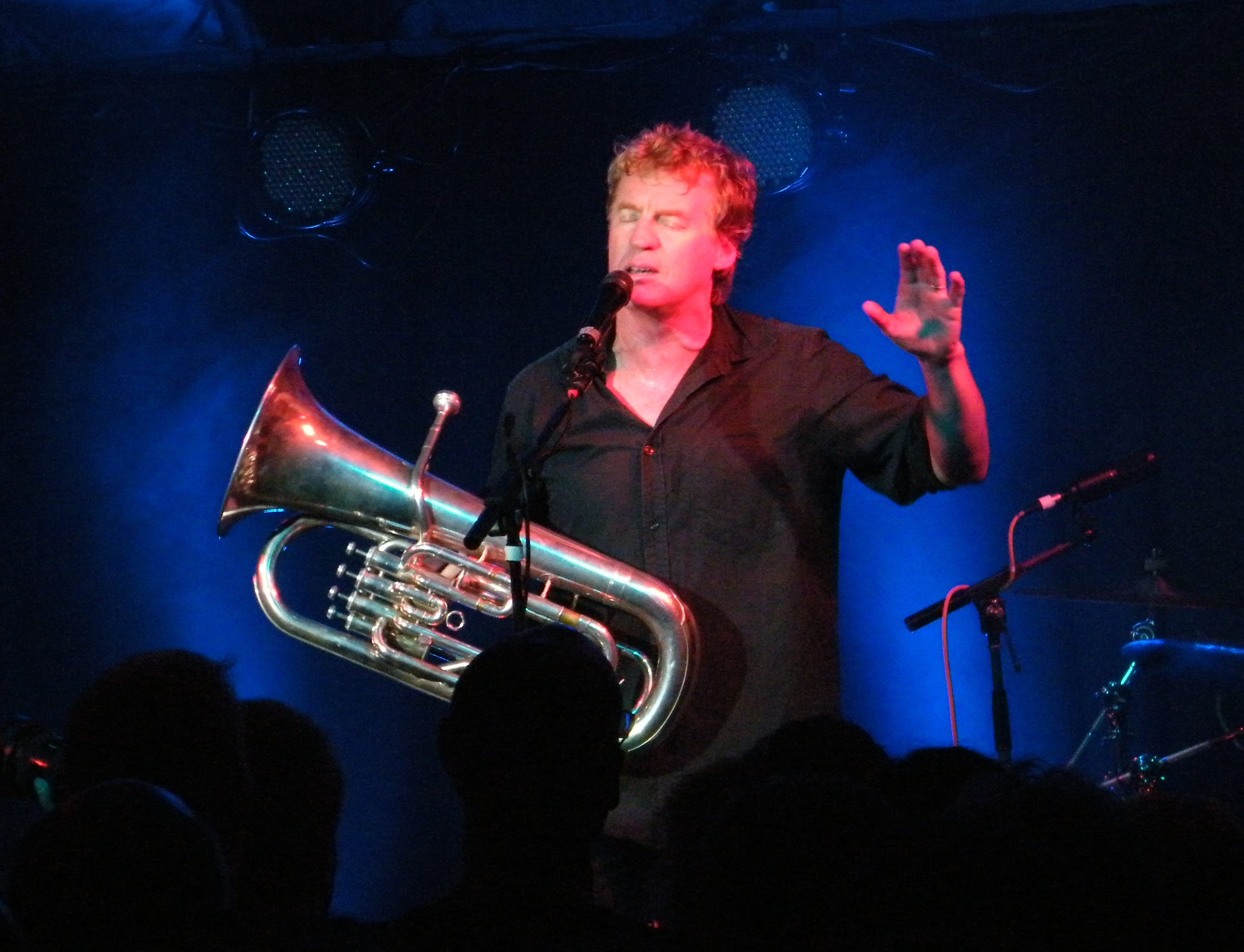
McGlashan playing the Euphonium in concert with the Mutton Birds, 2012

McGlashan played euphonium on album Time On Earth, by Crowded House. He played live with the band at Glastonbury 2008 and was a regular member of the touring line-up throughout their 2008 world tour. Later he played euphonium on track 'Hole In My Head' by Melbourne singer/songwriter Marjorie Cardwell, for her 2012 album In Another World.

In 2012, McGlashan and Dave Dobbyn partnered for the Acoustic Church Tour.

In 2015 he released his third solo album Lucky Stars, which he described as "his most personal album yet".

In 2022 he released his fourth solo album Bright November Morning which includes songs from his early days playing gigs with The Mutton Birds to his song about the 1881 invasion of Parihaka, titled John Bryce. McGlashan said it was hard to pinpoint where the album fits in his career.

"It'd be like looking at a whole photo album of the last few years and saying this is exactly where I am, these are all the things that sort of make up who I am and who I am right now." Soon after its release the album reached the top of the New Zealand Record Album Music Charts

=== Soundtrack work ===
McGlashan began contributing to soundtracks as early as 1980, when he was one of the trio who composed the music for New Zealand police series Mortimer's Patch. McGlashan composed occasionally for the screen over the next two and a half decades, including work on Jane Campion's film An Angel at My Table; Cinema of Unease, a documentary about the history of New Zealand cinema; and long-running detective series Street Legal.

From 2005 onwards, McGlashan began to devote a lot more energy to soundtrack work. Since then he has composed the music for more than a dozen screen projects – predominantly feature films (including The Dead Lands and the orchestral soundtrack for Dean Spanley) – as well as short films (Tick) and television (Katherine Mansfield telemovie Bliss, TV series Orange Roughies).

The song "Bathe In the River" featured on McGlashan's soundtrack to acclaimed Toa Fraser film No. 2 (2006, also known as Naming Number Two). Sung by Hollie Smith, it reached number 2 on the New Zealand music charts and went platinum. The song also won him the 2006 APRA Silver Scroll Award, his second win.

In 2011 McGlashan provided the score to the fireworks during the opening ceremony of the 2011 Rugby World Cup.

== Musical style ==
McGlashan is noted for writing lyrics that feature New Zealand imagery and vernacular, many involving his hometown of Auckland. Examples include Dominion Road in Auckland ("Dominion Road"), the Auckland Harbour Bridge ("Harbour Bridge"), Takapuna Beach ("Andy"), and the Coromandel ("Passenger 26"). The Valiant in "White Valiant" was a commonly seen car in 1970s-era New Zealand: McGlashan never owned one, though fellow musician Dave Dobbyn did.

McGlashan is also known for writing about real-life events and people, including:

- The 1990 Aramoana massacre ("A Thing Well Made")
- the 1993 Kader Toy Factory Fire in Thailand ("Toy Factory Fire")
- Opo the dolphin ("Miracle Sun")
- John Bryce and his invasion of Parihaka ("John Bryce")
- Polar explorer Sir Ernest Shackleton ("Shackleton")

McGlashan noted that while living in England as a member of the Mutton Birds, he still wrote "letters to home" to New Zealand in his songs, as he struggled to find a connection with English imagery.

In 1998 McGlashan explained his writing process as "trying to write about people that I know. I suppose I 'write letters' to people, or try to unpick a moment that I’ve lived through and either tell the story in the first person or make up some characters who then tell the story in their own words – and by using what they don’t say as much as what they do say, try and paint their world in a song."

He has also played a number of different instruments throughout his musical career: asked what instruments he plays, he answered, "Well I don't play violin". However, he is noted for playing the euphonium and French horn. With Blam Blam Blam, McGlashan played drums and euphonium. He later picked up guitar duties for his work with The Front Lawn and The Mutton Birds.

== Discography ==
=== Albums ===
Year	Title	Details	Peak chart positions
Year	Title	Details	NZ
2006	Warm Hand	Released: 1 May 2006; Label: Arch Hill Recordings; Catalogue: AHR024	11
2009	Marvellous Year	Released as Don McGlashan and the Seven Sisters; Released: 2 March 2009; Label: Arch Hill Recordings; Catalogue: AHR038	26
2015	Lucky Stars	Released: 17 April 2015; Label: Self-released	5
2022	Bright November Morning	Released: 25 February 2022; Label: Self-released (Doncorp)	1

==== With From Scratch ====
- From Scratch Perform Rhythm Works (1979) self-released
- 3 Pieces From Gung Ho 1,2,3D (1983) Hit Singles
- Pacific 3,2,1,zero (Part 1) – Drum/Sing (1985) Flying Nun Records
- Gung Ho 1,2,3D (1988) Flying Nun Records

==== With Blam Blam Blam ====
- Luxury Length (1982) Propeller Records/Festival Records

==== With The Front Lawn ====
- Songs from The Front Lawn (1989) Front Lawn Records
- More Songs from The Front Lawn (1993) Virgin Records

==== With The Mutton Birds ====
- The Mutton Birds (1992) Bag Records
- Salty (1993) EMI Records
- Envy of Angels (1996) EMI Records
- Rain, Steam and Speed (1999) Shhh! Records
- Flock: The Best of the Mutton Birds (2002) EMI Records

=== Soundtracks ===
==== Movies ====
- Other Halves (NZ 1984)
- The Grasscutter (NZ/UK 1988) (with Wayne Laird)
- An Angel at My Table (NZ 1990)
- Absent Without Leave (NZ 1992)
- Cinema of Unease (UK/NZ 1995)
- Like It Is (UK 1998)
- No. 2 (NZ 2005)
- Out of the Blue (Song: "I Will Not Let You Down") (NZ 2006)
- The Last Magic Show (NZ 2007)
- The Tattooist (Song: "I Will Not Let You Down") (NZ 2007)
- Dean Spanley (UK/NZ 2008)
- Show Of Hands (NZ 2008)
- Matariki – (NZ 2010)
- Sione's 2: Unfinished Business (NZ 2012)
- Kiwi Flyer (NZ 2012)
- The Dead Lands (NZ/UK 2014)
- Vermilion (NZ 2018)

==== Short films ====
- "The Lounge Bar" (1989) (as The Front Lawn)
- "Linda's Body" (1990) (as The Front Lawn)
- "The Painted Lady" (2000)
- "Tick" (2002)

==== TV ====
- Mortimer's Patch (NZ 1979–1984) (with Wayne Laird and Keith Hunter)
- Terry and the Gunrunners (NZ 1985)
- Street Legal (NZ 2000–2003)
- Orange Roughies (NZ 2006)
- This Is Not My Life (NZ 2010)
- RocKwiz contestant and guest (episode 94), along with Jenny Morris
- Kiri and Lou (2019–24 ) (NZ/Canada)

== Acting in film ==
=== Shorts ===
The Front Lawn:

- "Walkshort" (NZ 1987) – all the characters were played by Don McGlashan and Harry Sinclair.
- "The Lounge Bar" (NZ 1989) Don McGlashan – Mike
- "Linda's Body" (NZ 1990) Don McGlashan – Ben

=== Feature film ===
- Perfect Strangers (NZ 2003): singing "Anchor Me" with band in bar.

== Theatre ==
- Co-founder of Watershed Theatre, Auckland 1990 (disbanded 1995)
- Play 2, Maidment Studio Theatre, October 2002: Don McGlashan played a choirmaster.

== Dance ==
=== Music for Limbs Dance Company ===
New Zealand

- "Arcade" (1981)
- "This Is A Love Song" (1983)
- "Decoy" (1984)
- "Souvenirs" (1984)
- "Vigil Switch" (1985)
- "Now Is The Hour" (1988)

=== Laura Dean Dancers and Musicians ===
New York, 1983

- He co-composed the scores to two new Dean pieces
- Later appointed music rehearsal director.
- Toured with the company on US and European tours, playing drums and synthesiser.

== Awards ==
=== New Zealand Music Awards ===
Year	Nominee / work	Award	Result
1981	Blam Blam Blam – "No Depression in New Zealand"	Single of the Year	Nominated
1981	Blam Blam Blam	Most Promising Group	Nominated
1989	The Front Lawn – Songs from The Front Lawn	Album of the Year	Nominated
1989	The Front Lawn	Most Promising Group	Won
1989	The Front Lawn	International Achievement	Won
1989	The Front Lawn	Best Film Soundtrack/Compilation	Won
1993	The Mutton Birds – The Mutton Birds	Album of the Year	Won
1993	The Mutton Birds – Nature	Single of the Year	Won
1993	The Mutton Birds	Best Group	Won
1993	Fane Flaws and The Mutton Birds – "Nature" (The Mutton Birds)	Best Video	Nominated
1995	The Mutton Birds – Salty	Album of the Year	Nominated
1995	The Mutton Birds	Best Group	Nominated
1995	Don McGlashan – "Anchor Me"	Best Songwriter	Nominated
1996	The Mutton Birds	Best Group	Nominated
1997	The Mutton Birds – Envy of Angels	Album of the Year	Nominated
1997	The Mutton Birds – "She's Been Talking"	Single of the Year	Nominated
1997	The Mutton Birds	Best Group	Nominated
1998	The Mutton Birds	Best Group	Nominated
1998	International Achievement	Best Group	Nominated
2000	The Mutton Birds – Rain, Steam and Speed	Album of the Year	Nominated
2000	The Mutton Birds – "Pulled Along By Love"	Single of the Year	Nominated
2000	Don McGlashan (The Mutton Birds)	Top Male Vocalist	Nominated
2006	Don McGlashan – Warm Hand	Album of the Year	Nominated
2006	Don McGlashan – Warm Hand	Best Male Solo Artist	Nominated
2006	Don McGlashan, Sean Donnelly, Ed McWilliams – Warm Hand (Don McGlashan)	Best Producer	Nominated
2009	Don McGlashan and the Seven Sisters	Best Male Solo Artist	Nominated
2009	Don McGlashan, Sean Donnelly – Marvellous Year	Best Producer	Nominated

=== Silver Scrolls ===
McGlashan has won the APRA Silver Scroll twice. In 2006, McGlashan had two songs nominated for this award – a feat last achieved by Dave Dobbyn in 1995. "Bathe in the River", written by McGlashan for the film No. 2, later won the award.

Year	Work	Result
1994	"Anchor Me"	Won
2006	"Bathe In the River"	Won
2006	"Miracle Sun"	Nominated

In 2001, a vote by members of APRA to find New Zealand's Top 100 songs (what would eventually become the Nature's Best series) included 5 McGlashan songs. These were:

- 23: The Mutton Birds – "Dominion Road"
- 49: The Mutton Birds – "Anchor Me"
- 66: Blam Blam Blam – "Don't Fight It Marsha, It's Bigger Than Both of Us"
- 69: Blam Blam Blam – "There Is No Depression in New Zealand"
- 82: The Front Lawn – "Andy" (co-written with Harry Sinclair)

In October 2023, McGlashan was inducted into the New Zealand Music Hall of Fame.

=== Other awards ===
- 2001 – University of Auckland Literary Fellowship.
- 2002 – Arts Foundation of New Zealand Laureate Award.
- 2003 – New Zealand Television Awards, Best Original Music for Street Legal.
- 2007 – Auckland City Council Living Legend Award.
- 2012 – University of Auckland Distinguished Alumni Award.
- 2012 – Antarctica New Zealand's Writers and Artists residency programme.
- 2013 – Michael King Writer's Centre Writer in Residence.

== Personal life ==
McGlashan married dancer and writer Marianne Schultz in 1989. The couple separated in 2012, and divorced in 2017. They have two children, Louie and Moe. McGlashan married Ann McDonell in 2018.

In 2008 McGlashan was angered that TVNZ had used a song performed by the Mutton Birds ("Anchor Me") when the election results showed that the National Party had won the New Zealand elections. McGlashan stated that he "would rather have sex with a very ugly crayfish" than let the National Party use his music. The song had been used by TVNZ in terms of the Australasian Performing Right Association's blanket licence with TVNZ.

On 28 March 2011 McGlashan suffered three broken ribs, a punctured lung, and a broken collarbone after he hit a car door while cycling down Valley Road, Auckland. He was hospitalised.

== Other sources ==
- Chunn, Mike and Chunn, Jeremy, The Mechanics of Popular Music, A New Zealand Perspective, GP Publications, 1995. ISBN 1-86956-130-9
- Dennis, Jonathan and Bieringa, Jan (eds), Film in Aotearoa New Zealand, Victoria University Press, 2nd Edition, 1996. ISBN 0-86473-309-7
- Dix, John, Stranded in Paradise, Penguin, 2005. ISBN 0-14-301953-8
- Eggleton, David, Ready To Fly, Craig Potton, 2003. ISBN 1-877333-06-9
- Martin, Helen and Edwards, Sam, New Zealand Film 1912–1996, Oxford, 1997. ISBN 0-19-558336-1
- Shute, Gareth, NZ Rock 1987–2007, Auckland, Random House, 2008. ISBN 978-1-86979-000-4
- Spittle, Gordon, Counting The Beat, GP Publications, 1997. ISBN 1-86956-213-5
