= David Long (New Zealand musician) =

New Zealand musician

David Long is a musician, composer and producer. In 2020 he won best score at the APRA Silver Scrolls for the BBC drama series, The Luminaries. He composes mainly for film and television but also contemporary dance. He has worked on all of Peter Jackson’s films of the last two decades. He performs with two bands, The Labcoats (two albums) and Teeth (one album).

== Film career ==
In 2021 he composed the score for the feature film, Punch and a dance show for Tupua Tugafua as well as composing for two more series of Mystic. In late 2021 he is releasing an album for small ensemble.

In 2020 he composed (with Steve Gallagher) the score for the CBBC series, Mystic. He also composed for Sean MacDonald's dance show Ngā Wai for Atamira Dance Company.

In 2019 he composed the score for the BBC drama series The Luminaries and also the second series of the children's TV series Kiddets.

In 2009 he composed the additional score for Peter Jackson’s The Lovely Bones. For The Hobbit: An Unexpected Journey he wrote (in collaboration with Plan 9 Music) ‘Misty Mountain’, a song for the dwarves that also features as the major theme in the score and was used as the basis for the credits song by Neil Finn. He wrote music and created musical sound design for Peter Jackson's The Lord of the Rings and King Kong (also with Plan 9 Music).

In 2013 he composed the score for Beyond the Edge (dir. Leanne Pooley), Gardening With Soul (dir. Jess Feast) that premiered in the Wellington Film Festival. In 2012 three films were released that he scored: Robert Sarkies's Two Little Boys, Alyx Duncan's The Red House and Dan Salmon's Pictures of Susan (a feature documentary). In 2011 he scored Simon Pattison's film Rest for the Wicked and in 2010 wrote the score for Stephen Sinclair’s Russian Snark.

Long has composed for many television dramas and documentaries. Between 2009 and 2011 he created the music for the Weta Workshop children's series The WotWots (78 episodes) which has screened in over 100 countries. In 2009-10 he scored two series of Paradise Café, an NZ/UK (BBC) co-production. In 2010 he scored Ice, a mini-series for the UK's Power TV (starring Richard Roxburgh and Sam Neill). He won Achievement in Original Music at the Air New Zealand Film and Television Awards for two years running for his scores for the television series Insiders Guide to Happiness (2005), and for Insiders Guide to Love (2006).

He composed the score for Loren Taylor's 2024 romantic comedy film The Moon Is Upside Down.

== Dance and musical career ==
David has had a long association with contemporary dance. He has written many pieces for New Zealand's pre-eminent choreographer Douglas Wright. For the 2011 Auckland Arts Festival, he composed the music for Wright's dance show Rapt which toured to the Netherlands in 2013. He has also written for Sona McCullagh and Raewyn Hill, among others. He has released 3 solo albums, Cross Creek and Slim Volume and the soundtrack for Beyond the Edge (released by Rattle Records). He has also written a piece for the New Zealand String Quartet and Stroma, a contemporary chamber orchestra. He has released various experimental albums with The Labcoats and The Metabolists. A new Labcoats album is in the offing.

Long was a founding member of the seminal New Zealand band The Mutton Birds with whom he made 3 albums over 7 years. In 2012 they reformed for a wineries tour and returned to London to perform in October of that year. The Mutton Birds were asked by Peter Jackson to record a version of Don’t Fear the Reaper for the credits of The Frighteners. In the 1980s he was a member of The Six Volts - a Wellington experimental group.

He has produced many albums for a wide variety of artists including Dave Dobbyn’s Available Light (2005), two albums for Barry Saunders, Red Morning, (2005) and Zodiac, (2009), Lucid 3's Dawn Planes (2007) and Leila Adu's Cherry Pie (2006). He won Producer of the Year at the 2002 New Zealand Music Awards for Fur Patrol’s Pet.
