= Alan Gregg (musician) =

New Zealand musician

Alan Gregg is a New Zealand musician, originally from Palmerston North, now based in London. Originally a keyboard player, Alan has mainly played bass guitar in his professional life. After moving to Auckland, New Zealand, Alan was a member of the Dribbling Darts of Love before joining The Mutton Birds, which he was part of from 1992 to 1998 (and again, returning for live shows, in 2001). In The Mutton Birds he contributed bass, vocals, keyboards and wrote a number of songs. After leaving the Mutton Birds, he acted as a producer and studio and touring musician before recording his first solo album, under the name Marshmallow in 2002. Other musicians on the album included Bic Runga, Ron Sexsmith, and Andrew Claridge.

In 2007, after hearing them singing through the wall of a rehearsal studio, Alan Gregg joined Cy Winstanley and Ange Boxall in The Desert Downtown, which also includes drummer Steve Brookes.

Alan has appeared as a musician on albums by artists such as Dave Dobbyn, and Bic Runga. He produced, 'Brand New', the second album by New Zealand band The Stereo Bus.

In 2024 Gregg introduced a new project Polite Company. A debut single 'Circulation' was released in April 2024, followed by another single 'Barefoot Billionaire' and an album 'Please Go Wild' Gregg also contributed as a bassist to Kirsten Morrell's 2024 album Morrellium.
