= The Plague (New Zealand band) =

New Zealand art/rock band

- Origin: Auckland, New Zealand
- Genre: Rock
- Years active: 1977–1979
- Past members: Richard von Sturmer; Don McGlashan; Tim Mahon; Mark Bell; Ian Gilroy; Andrew Snoid

The Plague was a New Zealand theatrical punk/art rock band that was active from 1977 to 1979, and was led by Richard von Sturmer. Their most famous performance was at the Nambassa Music Festival in 1979 and they recorded four tracks for the Infectious EP. Von Sturmer went on to a career in writing and film-making and other members went on to play in bands such as The Whizz Kids, Blam Blam Blam, The Swingers, Coconut Rough and Pop Mechanix.

== History ==
In 1977, Aucklander Richard von Sturmer returned from England, "charged with the new punk movement that flourished there. He assembled a troupe of 'actors' and they rehearsed a series of theatre/music pieces revolving around his poetry and showmanship. They called themselves The Plague." They wore unusual costumes and performed satires on bureaucracy, cancer and necrophilia. One of the members was guitarist Tim Mahon (The Whizz Kids, Blam Blam Blam), from the same school as von Sturmer, Westlake Boys High School, who joined in 1978. Mahon wanted to improve the group's musical ability to match the theatrics and presentation, and recruited a trio who had played together at Westlake Boys High School, consisting of Mark Bell on guitar (Whizz Kids, Blam Blam Blam, Coconut Rough, Scribble), Ian Gilroy on drums (Whizz Kids, Crocodiles, The Swingers) and Andrew McLennan, a.k.a. Andrew Snoid, on keyboards and backing vocals (Whizz Kids, Coconut Rough, The Swingers, NZ Pop, The Zoo). With two guitarists and no bass guitar player, Mahon learned to play bass guitar.

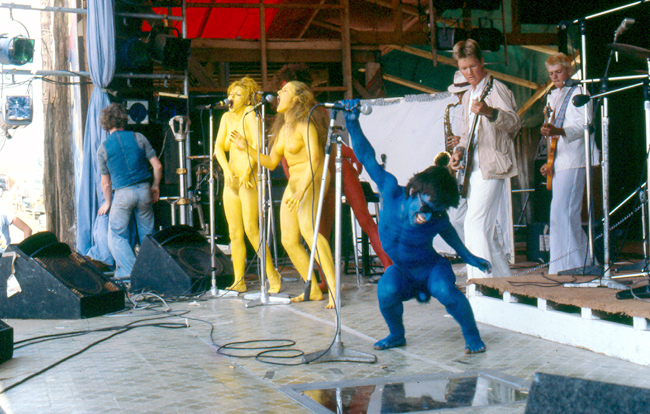
The Plague performing at Nambassa Music Festival 1979; Richard von Sturmer in blue body paint

The Plague's first gig was with punk band The Scavengers at the State Theatre on Symonds Street in Auckland. Von Sturmer and his backing vocalists, the Snoids, appeared naked apart from a covering of paint. Their most famous performance was in front of an audience of 30,000 at Nambassa Music Festival in January 1979, again in body paint; as related in the novel The Predictions, the lead singer in cobalt blue, the guitarist red, and the backing singers yellow.

In 1979, they recorded at Harlequin Studios in Mt Eden Road in Auckland. Four tracks were later released as the Infectious EP: "Seven Day Plan", "Kiwi Keith", "Mystery No Mystery" and "Voodoo T.V."

Don McGlashan described the music in an interview for Radio New Zealand's Musical Chairs in April 1998, "It was a really vicious noise, but it was really fun, fun to be part of." He played with The Plague a few times, coming straight from playing French horn in the Symphonia of Auckland (now the Auckland Philharmonia Orchestra), dressed in a 'penguin suit' and to stand on stage while people wearing only a coat of paint (assorted colours) would jump around him. Don McGlashan said of von Sturmer, "Richard was a really prolific writer – and still is." They used material from Inside Information; songs such as "Frank Gill's An Idiot" and "Private Property".

By late 1979, von Sturmer and the Snoids left the band and the other four musicians became the Whizz Kids. Von Sturmer went on to a career in writing and film-making.

Ian Gilroy then left the Whizz Kids to play with The Crocodiles, and then The Swingers. Andrew Snoid left to front Pop Mechanix. Mark Bell and Tim Mahon, with Don McGlashan who had been playing with the Whizz Kids, formed Blam Blam Blam.

The Plague reformed with its original lineup (apart from the drummer) to play at Neck of the Woods in Auckland on 22 April 2021. The performance launched a 12" album featuring four studio tracks and four live tracks all recorded in 1979 and a 7" single with two tracks recorded in 2020.

== Band members ==
- Richard von Sturmer
- Don McGlashan
- Tim Mahon
- Mark Bell
- Ian Gilroy
- Andrew McLennan, a.k.a. Andrew Snoid

== Other media ==
=== Film ===
- (1980) – Nambassa Festival (New Zealand) Nambassa Festival Trust with Dale Farnsworth
  - Director/editor: Philip HoweFilm Archive

=== Television ===
- (1980) – Radio With Pictures: Sweetwaters Special Television New Zealand
- (11 March 1980) – Video DV TV2
  - Dylan Taite fronts this documentary report on the 1980 Sweetwaters rock festivalFilm Archive

=== Related publications ===
| Von Sturmer, Richard | We Xerox Your Zebras | Modern House | (ISBN 1-86942-101-9) | 1988 |
| Von Sturmer, Richard | A Network of Dissolving Threads | Auckland University Press | (ISBN 1-86940-054-2) | 1991 |
| Sorrentino, Joseph & Von Sturmer, Richard | Images from the Center – Daily Life at an American Zen Center | Rochester Zen Center Publications | (ISBN 0-940306-49-2) | 1991 |
