= The Complete Blam Blam Blam =

The Complete Blam Blam Bam

Compilation album by Blam Blam Blam
- Released: November 1992
- Genre: Alternative rock
- Labels: Propeller, Festival

Blam Blam Blam chronology
The Blam Blam Blam Story (1984)	The Complete Blam Blam Bam (1992)

The Complete Blam Blam Bam is a compilation LP by Blam Blam Blam. It was released in November 1992.

== Track listing ==
1. There Is No Depression In New Zealand - 03:17
2. Battleship Grey - 03:01
3. Maids To Order - 03:27
4. Dr. Who - 02:25
5. Motivation - 04:12
6. Blue Belmonts - 05:10
7. Respect - 03:35
8. Got To Be Guilty - 03:30
9. Don't Fight It Marsha, It's Bigger Than Both Of Us - 04:45
10. Learning To Like Ourselves Again - 03:27
11. Call For Help - 04:51
12. Time Enough - 03:08
13. Like My Job - 03:17
14. Luxury Length - 03:14
15. Businessmen - 03:08
16. Talkback King - 03:49
17. The Bystanders - 05:39
18. Beach On 42nd Street - 04:38
19. Last Post - 02:55

== Personnel ==
- Tim Mahon - Vocals, Bass
- Mark Bell - Guitar, vocals
- Don McGlashan - Drums, Vocals, Bass
