= Westlake Boys High School =

- Māori: Te Kura Tuarua o Ngā Taitamatāne o Ururoto

Location
- Forrest Hill, Auckland, New Zealand; 36°46′36.04″S 174°44′57.98″E

Information
- Type: State single-sex boys secondary (Year 9–13)
- Motto: Virtute Experiamur; Let Courage Be Thy Test
- Established: 1962; 64 years ago
- Ministry of Education Institution no.: 37
- Headmaster: Paul Fordham
- Enrolment: 2,773 (July 2026)
- Houses: Hood; Murchison; Pupuke; Smale; Stanley; Ururoto
- Colours: Green; Red
- Socio-economic decile: 9Q
- Website: www.westlake.school.nz

Westlake Boys High School (Māori: Te Kura Tuarua o Ngā Taitamatāne o Ururoto) is a state secondary school for boys in Forrest Hill, Auckland, New Zealand. The school opened in 1962, when Westlake High School (opened 1958) split into Westlake Girls High School on the existing site and Westlake Boys High School on a new site. Serving Years 9 to 13, the college has 2,773 students as of July 2026.

In 2025, Paul Fordham, an ex-pupil of the school, was appointed as the school's eighth headmaster. He replaced David Ferguson who served as Headmaster for 15 years.

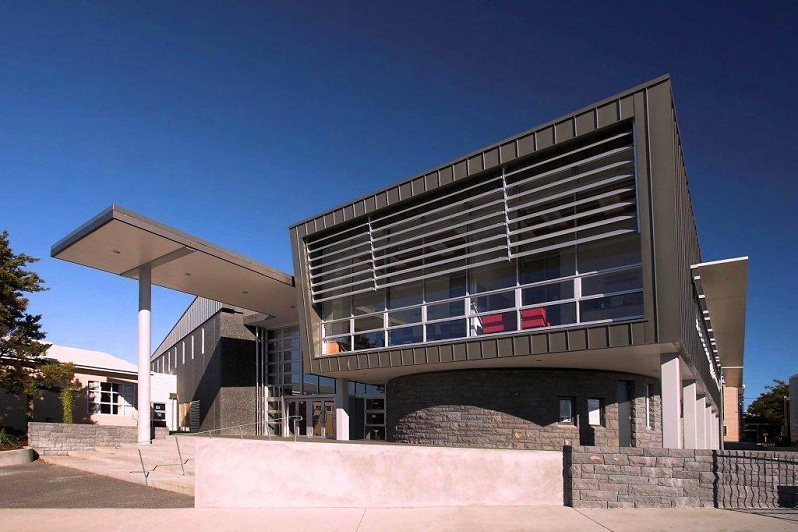
View of the school's main entrance

== Westlake Boys and Girls ==
Physically a few hundred metres apart, Westlake Girls and Westlake Boys engage in a joint annual theatrical production, participate in several joint musical ensembles (including a joint choir, two orchestras, a concert band and a jazz band), and some social dances, among other things. The two schools share a motto – Virtute Experiamur – "Let Courage Be Thy Test" in Latin.

== Enrolment ==
As of July 2026, the school has a roll of 2,773 students, of which 258 (9.3%) identify as Māori.

As of 2026, the school has an Equity Index of 399, placing it amongst schools whose students have the fewest socioeconomic barriers to achievement (roughly equivalent to deciles 9 and 10 under the former socio-economic decile system).

== Academic pathways ==
Westlake Boys High School uses the National Certificate of Educational Achievement to assess students. Until 2019, it also offered Cambridge Assessment International Education as an option, but this was phased out from 2016.

== Sporting ==
The school's teams compete in all Auckland and North Harbour inter-secondary school competitions leading to regional, national and international championships.

== Music and performing arts ==
The educational music programme covers performance, composition, analysis, history and aural skills. Along with the option of taking music as a subject, there is also a compulsory Year 9 course, focusing on the appreciation of music and drama in everyday life through theoretical and practical exercises, which runs for multiple weeks throughout the year.

The school has a number of performing groups: a choir ('Voicemale'), 2 Barbershop quartets ('The Lakeside Barbers' and 'Ken and the Men') a Concert Band, Stage Band, and Junior Symphonic band. Orchestral groups include the Westlake Symphony, Chamber Orchestra the junior Taharoto Orchestra and the boys' string groups Conchordia and Camerata. The performing groups have won awards at the annual KBB Music Festival (formerly the Auckland Secondary Schools Band and Orchestra Festival or 'ASSBOF'). Some groups, such as the Choralation Choir, which won the platinum award at the Big Sing Finale in 2009, 2010, and 2011 are combined with Westlake Girls High School.

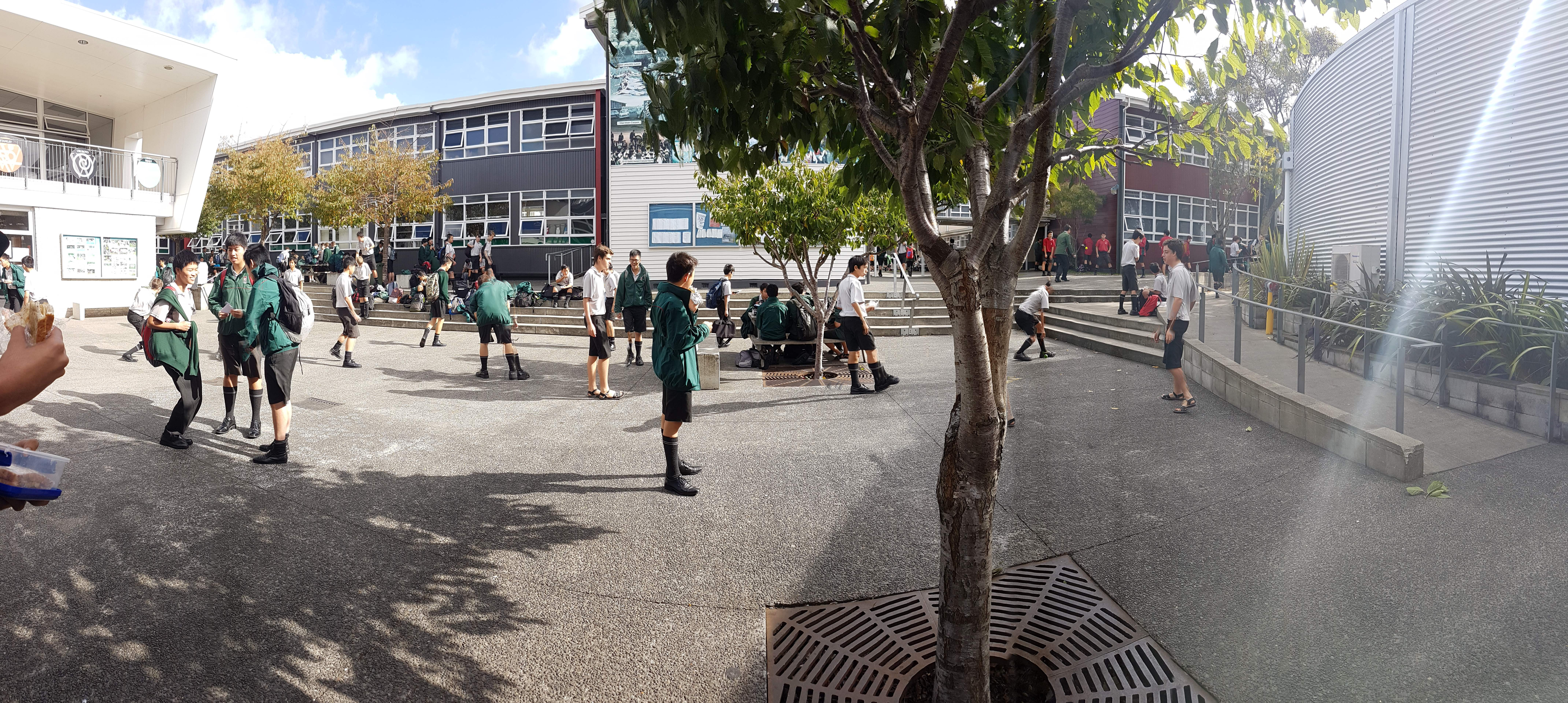
View of the school quad

== Notable alumni ==
=== Arts ===
- David Griffiths (composer)
- Martin Henderson – film, TV and theatre actor
- Rhys Mathewson – comedian
- Don McGlashan – musician, The Mutton Birds and Blam Blam Blam
- Tim Mahon and Mark Bell – founding members of Blam Blam Blam
- Alex Taylor – composer, poet and writer

=== Business ===
- A. J. Hackett – popularised bungee jumping
- John Hood – Rhodes Scholar, former CEO of Fletcher Challenge, former Vice-Chancellor of the University of Auckland and of Oxford University

=== Environment ===
- Winston Cowie
- Stephen King – conservationist

=== Journalism ===
- Duncan Garner – television journalist

=== Politics ===
- Phil Twyford - politician

=== Science ===
- Charles R. Alcock – astronomer, director of the Harvard-Smithsonian Center for Astrophysics

=== Sport ===
==== Basketball ====
- Thomas Abercrombie
- Jarrod Kenny
- Robert Loe
- Sam Mennenga
- Kirk Penney
- Jack Salt
- Corey Webster
- Tai Webster
- Yanni Wetzell

==== Cricket ====
- Andre Adams – former Black Cap
- Billy Bowden – ICC cricket umpire
- Paul Hitchcock – former Black Cap
- Bevon Jacobs – New Zealand cricketer
- Justin Vaughan – former Black Cap, CEO New Zealand Cricket
- Lou Vincent – former Black Cap (National Cricket Team)
- Willie Watson – former NZ cricketer

==== Football ====
- Robert Ironside – former captain All White
- Neil Jones – former All White
- Tommy Smith – footballer, All Whites

==== Motorsport ====
- Nick Cassidy — New Zealand racing driver, current Formula E driver for Jaguar TCS Racing.

==== Rowing ====
- Michael Brake – 2021 Olympic Gold medallist
- Andy Hay – 1984 Olympic coxswain
- Barrie Mabbott – Olympic Bronze medallist rower
- Mike Stanley – 1984 Olympic rower
- Eric Verdonk – Olympic Bronze medallist rower

==== Rugby league ====
- Frano Botica – former All Black and Kiwi
- Moses Leo - current Melbourne Storm player
- Taniela Tuiaki – former Kiwi and West Tigers

==== Rugby union ====
- Finlay Brewis - current Crusaders rugby player
- Chandler Cunningham-South - current England rugby player
- Nick Evans – former All Black
- Mike Harris – former Wallaby
- Dillon Hunt – former All Black
- Fine Inisi - current Tonga rugby player
- Lotu Inisi - current Tonga rugby player
- Luke McAlister – former All Black
- Jock McKenzie - former Blues rugby player, current Auckland Aces cricket player
- Wayne Pivac – former Wales national rugby union team coach
- Inia Tabuavou - current Fiji rugby player
- Caleb Tangitau - current Highlanders rugby player
- Ron Williams – former All Black

==== Sailing ====
- Tom Ashley – Olympic Gold medalist board sailor
- Dean Barker – a skipper of Team New Zealand, has participated in America's Cup and Louis Vuitton Cup as well as representing New Zealand at Olympics
- Chris Dickson – former helmsman of BMW Oracle Racing and had participated in Louis Vuitton Cup
- Hamish Pepper – Navigator of Team New Zealand, has participated in America's Cup 2003 as well as representing New Zealand at Olympics in 1996, 2004, 2008 & 2012

==== Shooting ====
- Malcolm Cooper – double Olympic Gold Medallist and founder of weapons manufacturing company Accuracy International, makers of the Arctic Warfare Magnum rifle
