= Andrew Snoid =

New Zealand musician

Andrew Snoid (born Andrew McLennan, 1960) is a New Zealand musician, singer, and songwriter.

He featured in bands such as the Plague, the Whizz Kids, Blam Blam Blam (briefly), Pop Mechanix, the Swingers, and Coconut Rough. Snoid is best remembered as the writer and singer of the Coconut Rough song "Sierra Leone", which was a big domestic hit in 1983, staying in the charts for 17 weeks.

In 2015, he was fronting his group Andrew McLennan and the Underminers, which included Piri Heihei on guitar and vocals, pianist Michael Larsen formerly with Jan Hellriegel, and on drummer Gary Hunt who had played with the Terrorways and Gary Havoc & The Hurricanes.

In 2016 McLennan embarked on a "World Tour at Your Place" with "Telling Tales", featuring Stephanie Crawford, Kim Gruebner, Nick Jones, Tracey Collins, and guests Mark Bell, Dave Bridgman, and Geoffrey Chunn.
