= Ivan Zagni =

- Born: 16 October 1942 (age 84); Norwich, England
- Instruments: Singer, songwriter, guitar
- Years active: 1959–present
- Labels: Propeller Records, Ode, Unsung

Ivan Zagni (born 16 October 1942) is a New Zealand-based musician and composer who has been a member of bands such as The Jody Grind, Big Sideways and Avant Garage, and has recorded albums with Aynsley Dunbar, Elton Dean, Don McGlashan and Peter Scholes.

== Early pop and rock years ==
Ivan Zagni sang as a boy chorister at Norwich's St John the Baptist Catholic Cathedral and began taking guitar lessons at age 12. In 1958 he performed his own composition "Black Coffee" for a local documentary screened on BBC TV. His first group was The Cadillacs with his brothers John and Frank. He then teamed up with vocalist Mike Patto (Spooky Tooth) in The Continentals, soon renamed The News and signed to Decca for two singles. Zagni moved to London in 1964 where he worked as a freelance guitarist, composer and arranger, session musician for Decca and Transatlantic, and played with a variety of groups including Chicago Line Blues Band with Patto, Tim Hinkley and Louis Cennamo. Patto later joined Timebox who covered Patto/Zagni composition "A Woman that's Waiting" as the b-side to their single "Begging'", which charted in the UK at No. 38 in July 1968. Zagni joined the progressive group Jody Grind and recorded on their first album, then in Bogomas with Louis Cennamo, and then in Blue Whale with Aynsley Dunbar, who disbanded the group to join Frank Zappa.

== Mature British works ==
In 1970 he returned to Norwich to study piano and composition. From 1971 to 1977 he was Choir Master at St John the Baptist Cathedral in Norwich where he composed a number of works for the cathedral. He then returned to London, becoming increasingly involved in the European improvisation scene and spending six months in Amsterdam. He recorded the album Three's Company with saxophonist Elton Dean (Keith Tippett sextet/Soft Machine), as well as The Electric String Trio with Phillipp Wachsmann and Marcio Mattos. He also performed in Keith Tippett's Arc and in Paris with New York-based Japanese experimental musician Kosugi with whom he recorded a 10-hour performance.

== Arriving in New Zealand ==
Zagni settled in New Zealand in 1980 and has since worked as a teacher, composer and freelance musician. He quickly connected with the independent music scene and recorded a mini-album for Propeller Records with Don McGlashan who was also a member of Blam Blam Blam and From Scratch. In the mid-1980s Zagni formed the group Safe as Houses with McGlashan, Steve Garden and Peter Scholes but only performed once for the Christchurch Arts Festival.

== Avant Garage and Big Sideways ==
In the early 1980s, Zagni formed Big Sideways as part of a government scheme for unemployed musicians. These included Mark Bell (Blam Blam Blam/Coconut Rough), Jacqui Brooks, Scott Calhoun (Wentworth Brewster & Co.), Lee Connolly, Chris Green (The Hulamen/The Neighbours), Paul Hewett (Coconut Rough), Brent 'Sid' Pasley (Newmatics/Miltown Stowaways), John Quigley (The Bongos/Nairobi Trio), Kelly Rogers (Newmatics/Miltown Stowaways), Robbie Sinclair and Phil Steel. They toured nationally with assistance from NZ Rail. Their track 'Conversation With a Machine' later appeared on the compilation Unexplored – A Compilation Of New Zealand Recordings 1982–86. Big Sideways continued without Zagni and released the 3-song 12" Let It Out with new members including Graeme Gash, Debbie Harwood and Tom Ludvigson (Low Profile/Bluespeak). Justin Harwood (Coconut Rough/The Chills/Luna) also spent time in Big Sideways. They supported Split Enz on their 1983 New Zealand tour and were one of the last groups to play Mainstreet in Auckland.

Big Sideways evolved into the more advanced Avant Garage. Zagni's work with Steve Garden (Low Profile) on the Avant Garage album and their subsequent collaboration 'A Selection of Trouble Spots' (1984) recorded in Basement Tapes, Garden's basement studio, set the scene for what would become Garden's label Rattle Records.

== Orchestral commissions ==
From the mid-1980s Zagni received a succession of orchestral commissions. In 1986 Zagni and Peter Scholes' work together was the subject of the Radio New Zealand Concert programme Music on the Wall. He composed Migration Nos 1 and 2 (1988) for the New Zealand Symphony Orchestra. In 1989, while he was the Auckland Philharmonia Orchestra's first composer in residence, a position funded by the Queen Elizabeth II Arts Council, he was commissioned to compose Breath of Hope, which is notable for its references to New Zealand nature. Critic William Dart described Breath of Hope as "a historical and spiritual journey down the Waikato." The Cospatrick Tragedy, commissioned for New Zealand Chamber Orchestra, was recorded at a live concert at the Auckland Town Hall in 1993 by Radio New Zealand, one of many Zagni performances recorded by the national broadcaster.

Zagni's String Quartet No.1 (1992), A View from my Window, was composed in Wellington during his residency with Chamber Music NZ, and premiered by the New Zealand String Quartet. Quartet No.1 was also performed by the Mosaic Quartet in 1995 for Auckland City's Arts Alive programme. Devonport, his third string quartet, was commissioned for the Devonport Arts Festival on Auckland's North Shore, and premiered in 1994 – it was described by Dart as having "a cluster of minor tonalities" at its core. In the mid-1990s he withdrew from public life for a period of recuperation.

== Recent appearances ==
In 2003 Zagni was reunited with members of Blam Blam Blam/Big Sideways/Avant Garage to record with Tim Mahon's The Moth on the album Music From A Lightbulb. That year he was also the focus of a Radio New Zealand 'Musical Chairs' documentary. Several compositions were featured in the Auckland Chamber Orchestra's 2005 season, including his clarinet concerto 'The Koeakoea', performed in full for the first time after the 1987 Wellington premiere left out the violins. His graphic scores featured in exhibitions at the Audio Foundation in 2011 and the Gus Fisher Gallery in 2012, both accompanied by low-key performances.

== Awards ==
Zagni was Composer in Residence at Glenfield College for six months in 1986. He was inaugural Composer in Residence with the Auckland Philharmonia Orchestra in 1989–90 and Composer in Residence with Chamber Music New Zealand in 1992. Awards include major grants from QEII Arts Council in 1984, 1988, and 1990.

== Discography ==
- Jody Grind, One Step On (Oct 1969)
- Aynsley Dunbar, Blue Whale (BYG Records 529 015, released 1971)

Recorded March – April 1970, Marquee Studios, London

- Elton Dean, Three's Company, Two's a Crown (Culture Press 1005, 1997)

Recorded c.1977

- Blam Blam Blam, Luxury Length (Propeller Records REV 204, May 1982)

Blam Blam Blam is Don McGlashan, Tim Mahon and Mark Bell. Artwork: John Reynolds Ivan Zagni plays guitar on track 'Call for Help'

- Don McGlashan & Ivan Zagni, Standards (Propeller Records REV 207, December 1982)

Ivan Zagni: electric guitars, built-up 11 sting, cello guitar Don McGlashan: bass guitar, percussion, horn, whistle, vocals, marimba Backing vocals: Ivan Zagni, Kim Willoughby, John Quigley, Kelly Rogers, Syd Paisley, Anna Phillips, Ben Staples, Greg Brice, Martin Williams and Phil Steel Engineer: Martin Williams, Produced: Ivan Zagni, Don McGlashan and Martin Williams, Recorded at Last laugh Studios, Auckland, September/October 1982. Artwork: John Reynolds

- Big Sideways, Big Sideways (Unsung Music 2, 1982)

Big Sideways is Mark Bell, Jacqui Brooks, Scott Calhoun, Lee Connolly, Chris Green, Paul Hewett, Brent 'Sid' Paisley, John Quigley, Kelly Rogers, Robbie Sinclair, Phil Steele and Ivan Zagni Engineered by Lee Connolly and Simon Clark, Recorded and mixed at Harlequin Studios, Auckland, 1982 Musical Direction: Ivan Zagni

- Avant Garage, Music (Unsung Music UN11, 1983)

Avant Garage is Mike Caen, Pamela Gray, Wayne Laird, Mark McEwan, Tim Mahon, Prasada, Peter Scholes, Ben Staples and Ivan Zagni. Engineered by Steve Garden, recorded at Mascot Studios, Auckland, July 1983 Director: Ivan Zagni

- Avant Garage, Garage to Gallery (cassette release, Unsung Music, 1983)
- Ivan Zagni, London '79 (cassette release, Unsung Music, 1983)
- Ivan Zagni & Peter Scholes, Four Minute Exposure (cassette release, Unsung Music, 1983)
- Ivan Zagni & Steve Garden, A Selection of Trouble Spots (Ode SODE 193, 1984)

Also Peter Scholes, Don McGlashan and Amanda Hollins Engineered by Steve Garden at Basement Tapes, March 1983 – April 1984

- Tall Dwarfs, That's the Short and Long of It (Flying Nun Records Long 1, 1985)

Ivan Zagni contributes acoustic guitar, backing vocals and arrangements on the track 'Nothing's Going to Stop It'

- Auckland Philharmonia Orchestra, New Zealand Music Vol 4 (Ode CD MANU 1415, 1992)

Includes Ivan Zagni's composition, 'Breath of Hope'

- The Moth, Music From A Lightbulb (Global Routes, 2003)

Solo album from Tim Mahon with fellow ex-Blams Mark Bell and Don McGlashan with guest appearance from Ivan Zagni

== Scores ==
=== Film ===
- Just Passing Through (NZ 1986) Director: Judy Rymer, Producer: Eloise MacAllister, Writer: Sandi Hall
- Dance of the Elements (NZ 1988) Director/Photographer/Editor: Prue Burch
- Behind Closed Doors (NZ 1991) Director: Shereen Maloney, Producer: Owen Hughes, Writers: Shereen Maloney and Jane Dowell
- Christmas Shopping (NZ 1991) Director: Diana Rowan, Producer: Owen Hughes, Screenplay: Diana Rowan

=== Television ===
- Peter Peryer: Portrait of a Photographer (NZ 1994) Director/writer: Greg Stitt, Producer: Trever Haysom, Camera: Leon Narbey

=== Dance ===
Music for Limbs Dance Company, New Zealand

- Brian Tries (1985) Choreographer: Mary–Jane O'Reilly, Music: Ivan Zagni/Steve Garden
- Sunday Horrors (1985) Choreographer: Mary–Jane O'Reilly, Music composer: Ivan Zagni & Steven Garden (NZ). Dur: 20:00
- Tarawera (1986) Choreographer: Mary–Jane O'Reilly, Music composer: Ivan Zagni (NZ).

Jean Batten (1988), a full-length dance suite for the Royal New Zealand Ballet. Meeting Places (1992) for Footnote Dance Company, premiered at New Zealand Festival of the Arts

== Other sources ==
- Norman, Philip: Bibliography of New Zealand Compositions, Third Edition; Nota Bene Music (1991)
- Dix, John, Stranded In Paradise, Penguin, 2005. ISBN 0-14-301953-8
- Eggleton, David, Ready To Fly, Craig Potton Publishing, 2003. ISBN 1-877333-06-9
- Tim Davey & Horst Puschmann, Kiwi Rock, Kiwi Rock Publications, 1996. ISBN 0-473-03718-1
- Graham Reid, "Guitar Player Wins Hearts", NZ Herald, 17 December 1987, p. 20.
