= Jyoshna =

British singer-songwriter (born 1956)

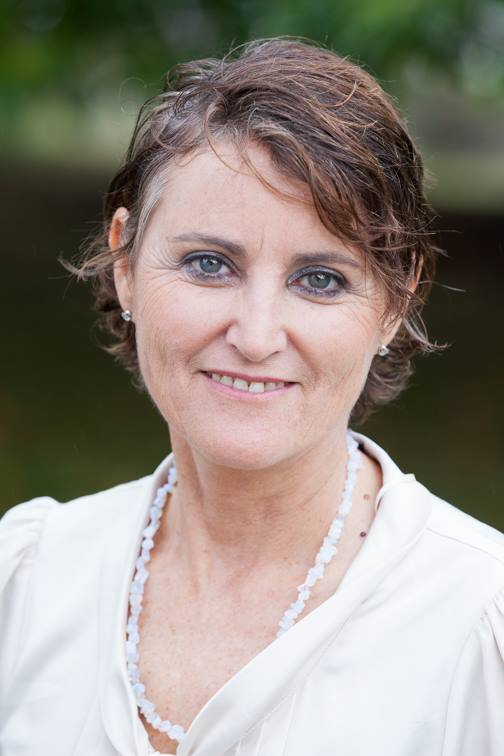
- Jyosha in 2018
- Born: Joanne La Trobe; 11 August 1956 (age 70); England
- Occupation: Singer-songwriter
- Years active: 1980s–present

Joanne La Trobe (born 11 August 1956) known professionally as Jyoshna (also spelled Jyosna, Joshna, or Jyotsna) is a British-born New Zealander Kirtan singer-songwriter and ethnomusicologist. Her stage name comes from Sanskrit and translates to "moonlight".

== Biography ==
Joanne La Trobe, was born in England on 11 August 1956 into a musical family. Her parents are Leslie Essex La Trobe and Toni La Trobe (a.k.a. Isobel Burton). The family migrated to Australia, then to New Zealand in 1963, which became their home. Jyoshna began composing at an early age and was performing with her band the Livewires at Greenmeadows Intermediate School, Manurewa. Her second band was named Turiiya, which included Daryn Long (a.k.a. Diipali Linwood) and Kim Wesney, and performed, composed and recorded together between 1983 and 1990. Since then, Jyoshna has performed as a solo artist and recorded many albums. She is always looking for new ways to express and explore music and spirituality from both western and eastern prospective, fusing sounds of traditional Indian music with western sensibility, taonga pūoro and singer/songwriter styles.

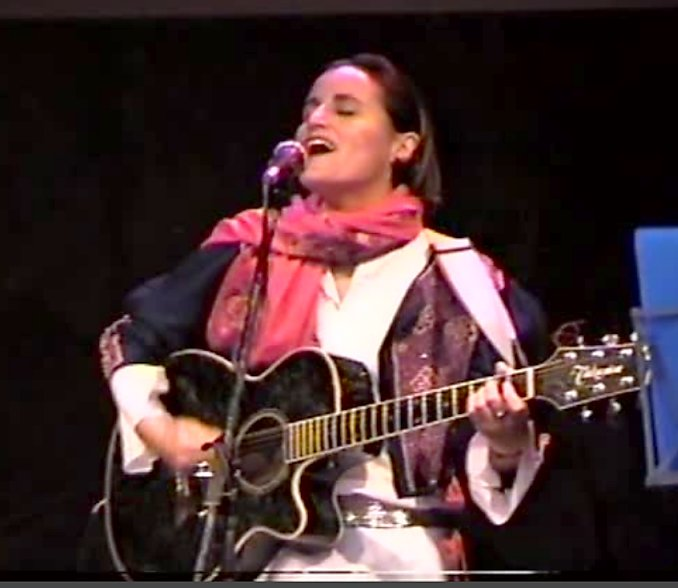
Jyoshna on stage, Hobart, Tasmania, 1995

Jyoshna's music has taken her to many countries of the world and at each place she has collaborated with local musicians: in India with the Mahato Kiirtan group and the Rarhi Chhau dance musicians; in London with the RAWA group; in Vermont USA with local musicians Tina Tourin and friends and in Brazil with Matrika (Cecilia Valentim, Sergio Leone, and Ramon Soza and friends). Her music has featured on Brazilian TV, NRK Norwegian and NZ TV. As an original composer, Jyoshna has authored many albums of both her own, as well as ethnographic material, including Red Earth Song (1996), Magnificence (2001) and Unity Hours I (2008), Unity Hours II (2010), Unity Hours III (2019), Unity Hours (2022). Jyoshna has composed music for the New Zealand feature film Stars in Her Eyes (2016, Dir. by Athina Tsoulis) and completed a new album called Dharma Cakra, Sanskrit songs for Meditation. Jyoshna is presently working as an itinerant lecturer, music teacher and composer at Bethells Beach in Auckland. Her other passion is ethnomusicology, and in 2010 she completed her PhD in music, at the School of Oriental and African Studies (SOAS), University of London on "Marai Kirtan and the Performance of Ecstasy in the Purulia District of West Bengal, India".

Jyoshna's research focuses on the 'praise music of West Bengal (Rarh), India, as well as Maori and indigenous people's music. She also has her own collection of audio visual material housed at the World Music Archives, British Library (C1211).

== Kirtan ==
As a musician and ethnomusicologist of eastern devotional singing, kirtan plays a major role in La Trobe's musical and academic career. Many of her music compositions are pada kirtan or 'devotional songs' and nama kirtan or "chanting the name of God". Her research into the background of kirtan led her to Rarh, India, the homeland of the Giita Govinda by Jayadeva (11th century) where she spent 2005–2010 documenting the traditional kirtan performances. Her own kirtan compositions are a blend of western singer/songwriter genres and Rarh devotional music.

== Rarhology ==
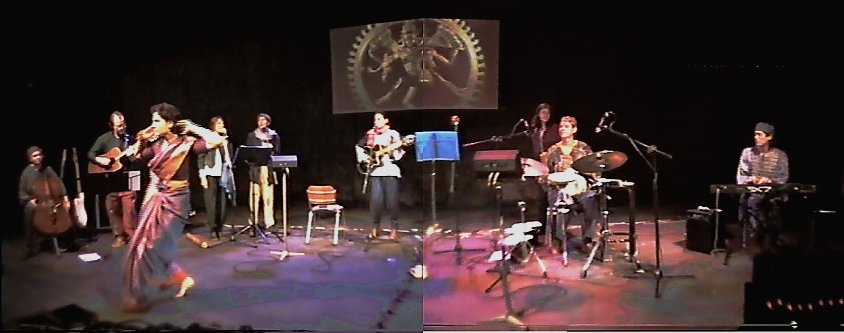
Jyoshna on stage with full band and Indian dancer, Hobart, Tasmania, 1995

Dr Jyoshna La Trobe's pioneering research work on the music culture of Rarh (1996–2010) is documented in her Masters Thesis Red Earth: the Music Culture of Rarh (University of Auckland) and her PhD Red Earth Song: marai kirtan and the performance of Ecstasy at the School of Oriental and African Studies (SOAS), London. Over 120 hours of audio visual material is deposited in the British Library World music Sound Archives in her catalogue called the La Trobe Rarhi Music Collection. Music genres of Rarh covered in the PhD include: jhumur 'folk songs', Baul 'mystic songs', nacini nach 'dancing girls dance' and the Chhau 'masked martial dance of the ancient warrior' as well as a musical analysis and transcriptions of marai kirtan 'praise music' performance. Video footage also includes Prabhat Samgiita ('songs of the new dawn'), composed by P. R. Sarkar.

== Selected discography ==
=== Solo albums ===
- 2022 Unity Hours IV, Malbay Studios, Milton Malbay, Ireland
- 2020 Akhanda Kiirtan 2, HPMGL Studio, Sunrise Farm, Co Clare, Ireland
- 2017 Unity Hours III, Audiosuite, Paraparaumu, Wellington, New Zealand
- 2016 Akhanda Kiirtan 1, HPMGL Studio, Sunrise Farm, Co Clare, Ireland
- 2014 Dharma Cakra, HPMGL Studio, Auckland, NZ, Innersong USA
- 2012 Live in Brazil, Innersong USA
- 2010 Unity Hours II, Sky Studios, London, Innersong USA
- 2007 Red Earth Fusion, Innersong, USA
- 2006 Unity Hours I, Sky TV Studio, London, Innersong USA
- 2004 Reddish Blossom, songs inspired by Prabhat Samgiit, Bengali love songs, Innersong, USA
- 2001 Era Dynamic,* MoreFm Studios, Auckland, NZ, Innersong USA
- 2001 Magnificence, Outback Studio, Auckland, INnersong USA.
- 1999 Dancing Divinity, Acoustic Wave, Auckland, NZ, Innersong USA
- 1997 Longing,* Q Studio, More Fm Studios Auckland, and Q Studios, Australia, Innersong USA
- 1996 Sounds of Silence,* More Fm Studio, Auckland, NZ, Innersong, USA
- 1993 Touched by the Sea,* Innersong, USA.
- 1993 Beloved, Innersong, USA
- 1991 Reign of Love, Acoustic Wave Records, Auckland, NZ

=== Group albums ===
- 2002 Lotus Beat, with EastranzWest, Visitors Records, NZ.
- 1989 Waiting – the Album with Turiiya, Jayrem Records, Wellington, NZ
- 1987 Daughters of the Flame, Harlequin Studios, Auckland, NZ 8
- 1986 with From Scratch – Pacific 3, 2, 1, Zero Part 1 and 2 Live, with Philip Dadson, Don McGlashan

* kiirtan recordings

== Selected publications ==
Articles

- 1997 "Red Earth – The Music Culture of Rarh, India". Unpublished MA, University of Auckland.
- 2000 Probe Magazine, Issue 2. Ancient patterns and Contemporary Expressions, Manukau Institute of Technology, Art SchoolPress, Auckland. Pg 16–21.
- 2010 Gurukul Network Issue 31, "The Supra-aesthetic Science of Kiirtan", pg. 16–20.
- 2010 "Marai kirtan and the performance of ecstasy in Purulia", West Bengal, India. Unpublished PhD.

== References and selected reviews ==
- Uniao TV Channel, Presentation/live and studio concert of her music with over a million viewers, Brasília, Brazil, 12 August 2011.
- NRK1 Television, Perspectiv, Norwegian TV Documentary on her music in London, April and November 2010.
- Robert Allen, "Unity Hours Review", The Rock Society, June/July 2008.
- NRK TV Norwegian TV Documentary, Perspectiv, Nov 2006.
- Graham Reid, "Magnificence by Joshna", New Zealand Herald, 10 March 2001
- Nick Bollinger "Joshna, Magnificence", NZ Listener, 10 February 2001, p. 35
- Jennifer Shennan "Leaping Lizards", Listener, 21 April 2001 p. 55
