= Andrew McLennan =

Andrew McLennan may refer to:

- Andrew Robert McLennan, Canadian provincial politician
- Andrew Snoid, New Zealand singer, originally Andrew McLennan
