= CLNZ Writers' Award =

Literary award in New Zealand

The CLNZ Writers’ Award is made annually with the support of the Copyright Licensing New Zealand (CLNZ) Cultural Fund. It is open to New Zealand writers of non-fiction, including educational material.

== History ==
The CLNZ Writers’ Award is an annual award for writers of non-fiction, including educational material.

Funding for the Award comes from the Copyright Licensing New Zealand (CLNZ) Cultural Fund which gets its revenue from CLNZ's licensing activity in New Zealand. Copyright Licensing New Zealand (CLNZ) is a not-for-profit organisation that was set up in 1988 by the Book Publishers Association of New Zealand (BPANZ) which later became PANZ (Publishers Association of New Zealand). CLNZ is now jointly owned by PANZ and the New Zealand Society of Authors (NZSA).

In 2016, following consultation with the New Zealand writing community, the Award was re-launched to provide an award for one writer each year for the following three years. Its aim is to provide financial support for New Zealand writers of non-fiction books, including those with an education focus, to help them spend time on specific non-fiction writing projects.

Applicants must be New Zealand citizens or permanent residents.

The Award is currently worth $25,000, making it one of the most valuable prizes for non-fiction writing in New Zealand.

== List of winners by year ==
2011: Malcolm McKinnon (The 1930s Depression in New Zealand) and Melissa Williams (Maori Urban Migrations from North Hokianga to Auckland 1930–1970)
Other finalists: Dr Lee Davidson (Mountain Feeling : The Lives of Climbers and Other Stories), Bradford Haami (Ka Mau Te Wehi : May the Force Be With You) and Janet Hunt (Dick Henry and the Birds)

2012: Hazel Petrie (Into the Darkness) and David Veart (Hello Boys and Girls)
Other finalists: Michael Corballis (The Wandering Mind), Vincent O’Malley (The Waikato War 1863–64) and Geoff Chapple (Terrain: North Island)

2013: Margaret Pointer (Niue – A History 1774–1974) and Geoff Chapple (Terrain)
Other finalists: Eleanor Black (Women of Cosme), Bruce Hayward (Geology and Landforms of northern New Zealand) Angela Middleton: ("Kia Kaha – Be Strong" William Cotton's New Zealand Journals 1942–1847)

2016: Neville Peat (The Invading Sea)

2017: Ben Schrader (Won and Lost: Saving New Zealand’s Built Heritage 1885–2016)

2018: Nic Low (Uprising)

2019: Rebecca Macfie (biography of Helen Kelly)

2020: Nick Bollinger (Revolutions Per Minute: The Counterculture in New Zealand 1960–1975)

2021: Jade Kake (legacy of Māori architect Rewi Thompson)

2022: Iona Winter (A counter of moons)

2023: Tom Doig (We Are All Preppers Now: Kiwis making plans for the end of the world)

== See also ==
- List of New Zealand literary awards
