= Zagni =

Zagni is a surname. Notable people with the surname include:

- Giancarlo Zagni (1926–2013), Italian director and screenwriter
- Ivan Zagni (born 1942), English-born New Zealand singer, songwriter, musician and composer
