= Richard von Sturmer =

New Zealand artist

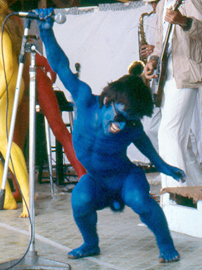
Richard von Sturmer (in blue body paint), performing at Nambassa Music Festival 1979

Richard von Sturmer (born 1957) is an artist, poet, playwright, film-maker, and musician from New Zealand. He was born in Devonport, North Auckland.

His poetry and prose has appeared in journals such as The New Zealand Listener, brief, Landfall, Sport, and Zen Bow.

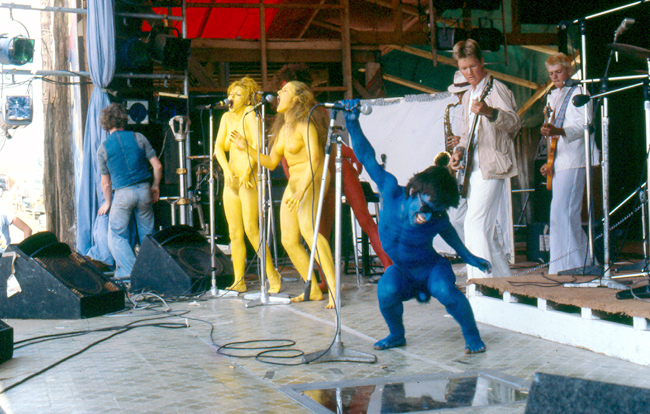
The Plague performing at Nambassa Music Festival 1979; Richard von Sturmer (in blue body paint)

In music, von Sturmer fronted New Zealand punk/art band The Plague, continued with The Humanimals, Avant Garage, and wrote the lyrics for Blam Blam Blam's anti-Robert Muldoon song "There Is No Depression In New Zealand", which has been described as a 'classic alternative national anthem.' The Plague are particularly known for their 1979 performance at the Nambassa festival, where four members (including von Sturmer) appeared naked apart from body paint.

Richard von Sturmer is a Zen Buddhist, who gave up eating meat when he was 16. He studied for ten years at the Rochester Zen Center in New York.

Von Sturmer is married to Sensei Amala Wrightson (previously Charlotte Wrightson), with whom he co-founded the Auckland Zen Centre.

From 2014, von Sturmer has worked with film-maker Gabriel White as the duo The Floral Clocks, with von Sturmer writing lyrics which White set to music. These songs were released as an album Desert Fire, mostly performed by White alone. A second album, A Beautiful Shade of Blue was released in 2017, and their third Gas Giant was released in 2019.

He was a finalist for the Mary and Peter Biggs Award for Poetry at the 2025 Ockham New Zealand Book Awards for Slender Volumes.

== Plays and film scripts ==
Von Sturmer was involved with the following plays and film scripts:

- 1976. Circadian Rhythms (dir: David Blythe)
- 1980. The Green Lion
- 1981. The Search for Otto

== Published collections of writing ==
Von Sturmer has published the following collections of writing:

- 1988. We Xerox Your Zebras
- 1991. A Network of Dissolving Threads
- 1998. Images From The Center (with photographer Joseph Sorrentino)
- 2005. Suchness: Zen Poetry and Prose
- 2009. On the Eve of Never Departing
- 2011. The Book of Equanimity Verses
- 2016. This Explains Everything (memoir)
- 2024. Slender Volumes (poetry)

== Exhibitions ==
Von Sturmer has had the following exhibitions:

- 1987 The Search for Otto in “Recent New Zealand Films”, Japan.
- 1990. The Search for Otto in “Images in Motion”. New Plymouth.
- 2007. 24 Tanka Films. Wellington. New Zealand Film Institute.
- 2010. Rubble Emits Light. Auckland. (Retrospective).
- 2011. The Stone Age Dream of Headstones. Auckland. (Group show)
