= Geoff Chapple (writer) =

New Zealand author and journalist

Geoff Chapple ONZM
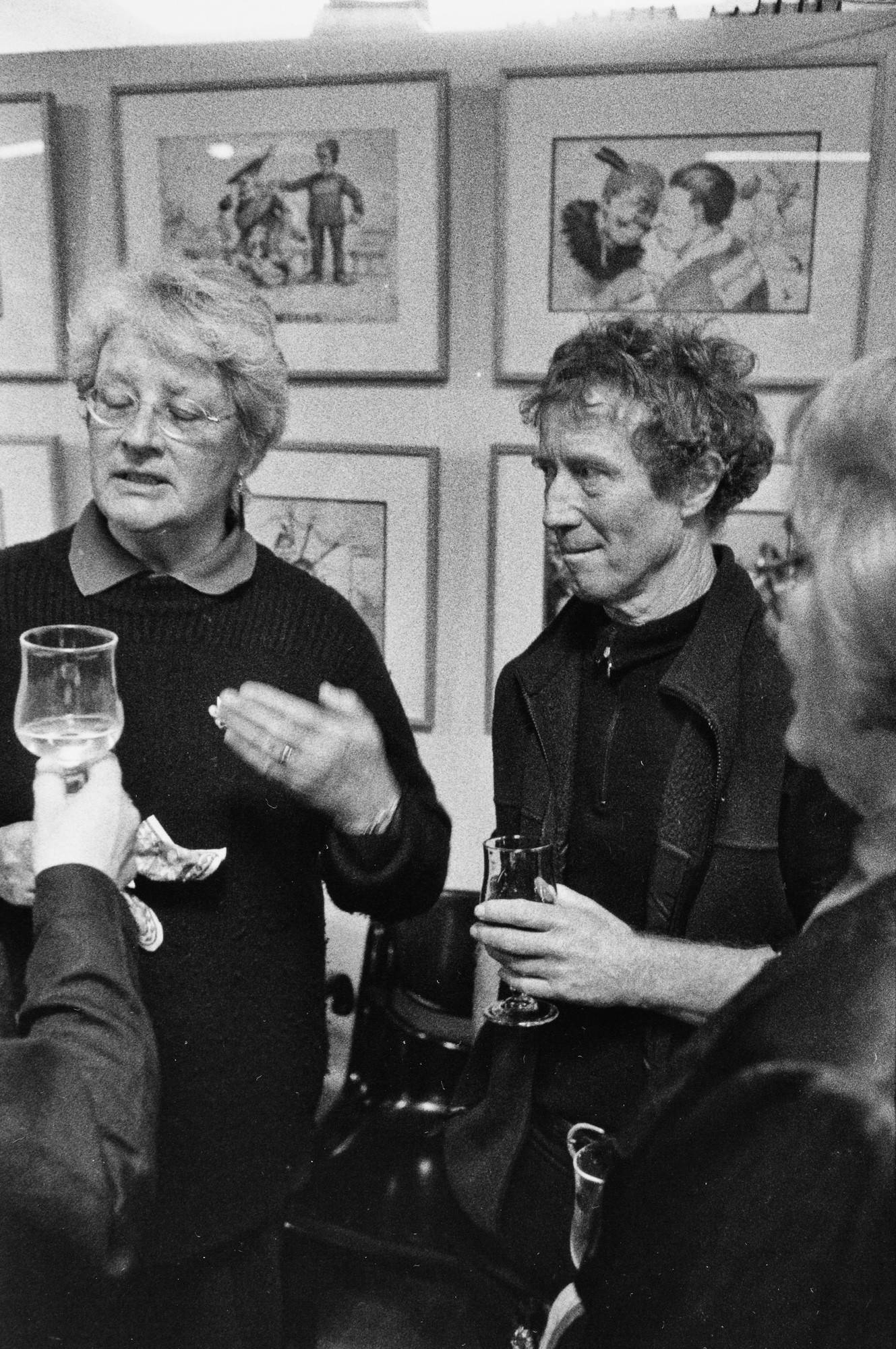
- Chapple with wife Miriam Beatson in 2000
- Born: Geoffrey John Chapple; 1944 (age 81–82)
- Occupations: Author; journalist
- Spouse: Miriam Beatson
- Children: 3
- Relatives: James Chapple (grandfather); Maurice Gee (cousin)
- Writing career
- Language: New Zealand English
- Notable work: Te Araroa: the New Zealand trail (2002)

Geoffrey John Chapple ONZM (born 1944) is a New Zealand author and journalist. He conceived and founded Te Araroa, a walking track the length of New Zealand.

== Life and career ==
Chapple grew up in West Auckland and attended Henderson High School. He began his journalism career writing for student magazine Craccum at the University of Auckland, and was appointed as editor in March 1967 whilst also working as journalist for the Auckland Star.

In 1974, Chapple was a founding member of the music group From Scratch. One of the group's well-known pieces was Pacific 3-2-1-Zero, a percussive piece written in 1981 in protest against nuclear testing and waste dumping in the Pacific Ocean. A 1993 film of the piece won the Grand Prix at the Midem Visual Music Awards in 1994.

Chapple was one of the writers of Gung Ho – Rewi Alley of China, a documentary filmed in 1979 about famous New Zealand writer and political activist Rewi Alley, and its companion documentary The Humble Force. Chapple subsequently wrote a biography about Alley that was published in 1980. In 1997, he co-wrote the libretto for an opera in two acts called Alley, with music by Jack Body, which premiered at the New Zealand International Festival of the Arts in 1998.

Chapple was a leading figure in the anti-apartheid protests surrounding the 1981 springbok rugby tour. In 1984, Chapple published 1981: The Tour, a book chronicling the events from the protesters' perspective.

Chapple co-wrote the script for The Navigator: A Medieval Odyssey, an acclaimed 1988 fantasy film directed by Vincent Ward. In 1989, he shared the award for Best Original Screenplay with Ward and co-writer Kely Lyons at the New Zealand Film Awards.

In 1990, Chapple received the Sargeson Fellowship, one of New Zealand's leading literary awards.

In 1994, in an article in the Sunday Star-Times, Chapple proposed the creation of a walking track from New Zealand's northernmost point at Cape Reinga to its southernmost point at Bluff. He began the volunteer movement to put in place a New Zealand-long walking track and founded Te Araroa Trust, the organisation that began construction of the various links for a continuous off-road track 2,920 kilometres long. He mapped the track, then walked it and wrote the book Te Araroa – The New Zealand Trail (Random House 2002), which won the Environment category at the Montana Book Awards in 2003.

Chapple was the first resident at the Michael King Writers Centre on the slopes of Mount Victoria when it opened in 2005. While in residence, he wrote a play called Hatch, or the Plight of the Penguins, which was produced by the Auckland Theatre Company and toured New Zealand and Tasmania from 2007 to 2010.

In the 2012 Queen's Birthday and Diamond Jubilee Honours, Chapple was appointed an Officer of the New Zealand Order of Merit, for services to tramping, tourism and literature. In 2013, he won the CLNZ Writers' Award for his project Terrain.

== Personal life ==
Chapple is a grandson of James Chapple, controversial Unitarian minister and pacifist, and a cousin of novelist Maurice Gee.

Chapple and his wife Miriam have three children. His son Amos is a photojournalist, his older daughter Polly is a digital design and transformation manager, and his younger daughter Irene is a journalist and filmmaker.

== Selected works ==
- Rewi Alley of China, that tells the story of Rewi's life-time contribution to humanity in China. Auckland: Hodder & Stoughton. 1980. ISBN 0-340-25687-7.
- 1981 : The Tour. Wellington: A H & A W Reed. 1984. ISBN 978-0589015343.
- South. Auckland: Hodder and Stoughton. 1986. ISBN 978-0-3404-0108-8.
- Edge of the Earth: stories and images from the Antipodes. Heinemann Reed. 1990. ISBN 978-0-7900-0146-3. (co-authored with Vincent Ward, Louis Nowra and Alison Carter)
- Te Araroa: the New Zealand trail. Auckland.: Random House New Zealand. 2002. ISBN 978-1-8694-1537-2.
- Terrain : Travels through a Deep Landscape. Auckland: Random House New Zealand. 2015. ISBN 978-1-77553-679-6.
