= Blam Blam Blam =

Former band in New Zealand

- Origin: New Zealand
- Years active: 1980–1984
- Past members: Tim Mahon; Mark Bell; Ian Gilroy; Don McGlashan

Blam Blam Blam were a New Zealand pop/rock/alternative band. Tim Mahon (bass) and Mark Bell (guitar, vocals) had been members of The Plague and The Whizz Kids. After losing their drummer Ian Gilroy to The Swingers in 1980, Tim and Mark joined up with Don McGlashan, a multi-instrumentalist who played drums and sang many lead vocals.

== History ==
The band's first release was the song Motivation on the Propeller Records Class of 81 compilation album in March 1981. They then released a four-track self-titled EP for the label, which hit the top 40 in New Zealand. The band had two hit singles in 1981 with "There is No Depression in New Zealand", and "Don't Fight it Marsha, It's Bigger Than Both of Us" (which McGlashan later re-recorded with The Mutton Birds).

In 1982 vocalist Dick Driver joined the band, but soon left. The band recorded an album Luxury Length, which reached No. 4. in the New Zealand charts. Later that year the band were involved in a car accident where Tim Mahon was seriously injured.

In 1984 the band briefly reunited, recording the live album The Blam Blam Blam story. Don McGlashan has since worked on a number of movie soundtracks, and been in the bands The Front Lawn, From Scratch, and The Mutton Birds, and recorded an album for Propeller Records with Ivan Zagni, who was a guest on Luxury Length. Tim Mahon and Mark Bell both played in Ivan Zagni's Big Sideways and Avant Garage groups. Tim Mahon has since worked in music management. Mark Bell works as a session guitarist and as a journalist.

"There is no Depression in New Zealand" remains a well-known song in its home country. One of its notable uses was as a maiden speech in Parliament in 2002. Metiria Turei of the Green Party read a Maori translation of the song, which Russell Brown's liner notes to The Complete Blam Blam Blam (see below) described as "a quirky, arty, militant thing to do. Which probably makes it a perfect Blam Blam Blam moment."

The Complete Blam Blam Blam was released in 1992. It contained almost the entire Blam Blam Blam back catalogue. This was remastered in 2003 by Chris Chetland at Auckland's Kog Transmissions, on a single CD, although the general consensus seems to be that the earlier mastering was superior. Another reunion tour accompanied the release.

They reformed again for a tour in mid-2007. In August and September 2019 a reunion tour included dates in Dunedin, Christchurch, Auckland, Paekakariki and Wellington.

== Discography ==
=== Albums ===
Year	Title	Details	Peak chart positions
Year	Title	Details	NZ
1982	Luxury Length	Label: Propeller; Catalogue: REV 204	4
1984	The Blam Blam Blam Story	Released as Blam Blam Blam With Guests Netherworld Dancing Toys; Label: CBS; Catalogue: SBP 237993	27

=== Singles ===
Year	Title	Peak chart positions	Album
Year	Title	NZ	Album
1981	Blam, Blam, Blam	25	EP
1981	"There is No Depression in New Zealand"	11	Non-album single
1981	"Don't Fight it Marsha, It's Bigger than Both of Us"	17	Luxury Length
1982	"Call for Help"	50	Luxury Length
"—" denotes a recording that did not chart or was not released in that territory.

=== Compilations ===
- The Complete Blam Blam Blam (1992)
