= Neville Peat =

New Zealand author and photographer (1947–2026)

Neville Peat MNZM
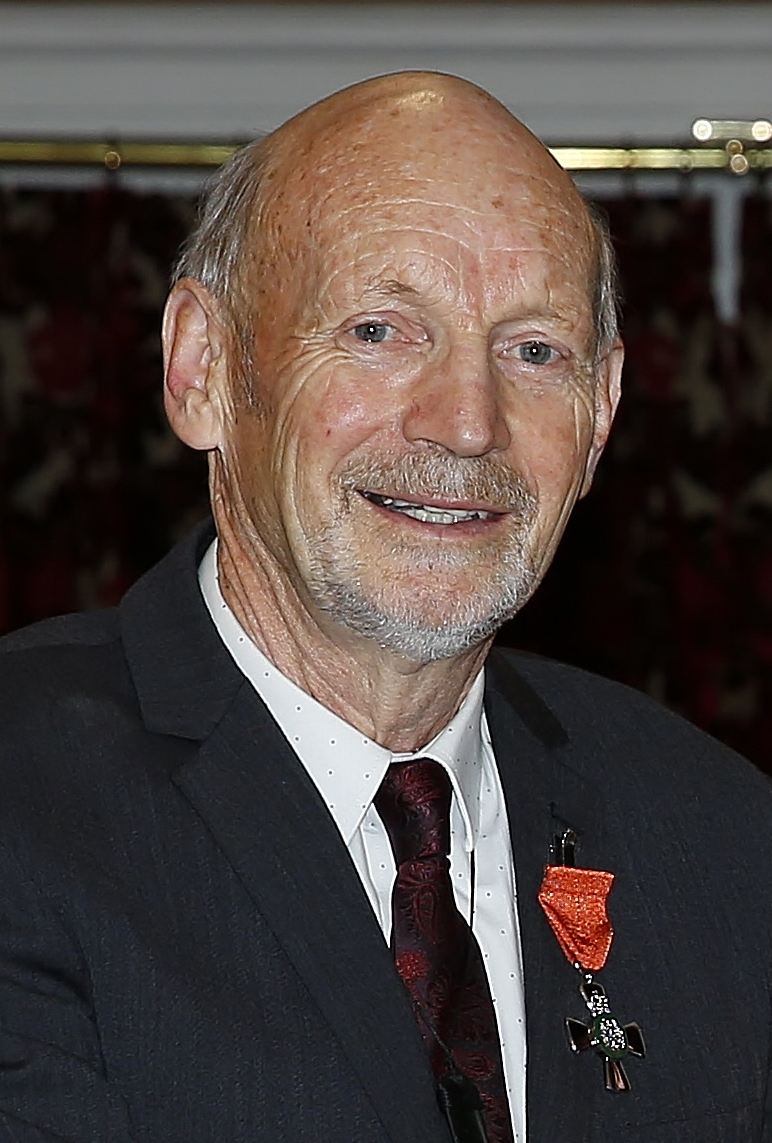
- Peat in 2018

Dunedin City Councillor
- In office 2013–2016

Otago Regional Councillor
- In office 1998–2007

Personal details
- Born: Neville Douglas Peat; 29 November 1947 Dunedin, New Zealand
- Died: 1 March 2026 (aged 78) Dunedin, New Zealand
- Occupation: Author; photographer

Neville Douglas Peat MNZM (29 November 1947 – 1 March 2026) was a New Zealand author and photographer, based at Broad Bay on the Otago Peninsula. He specialised in topics about natural history, notably that of southern New Zealand and New Zealand's subantarctic islands. Peat wrote over 40 titles from the late 1970s and wrote full-time from 1986.

== Life and career ==
Peat was born in Dunedin on 29 November 1947, the son of Ernie Peat and Jessie Peat (née Ayson). His heritage is Scottish, described as a fifth-generation descendant of Scottish pioneers in Otago.

He was an elected member of the Otago Regional Council from 1998 to 2007, and was its deputy chairperson from 2004 to 2007. He stood down in 2007 to take up the Creative New Zealand Michael King Writers' Fellowship, during which he completed a comprehensive book on the Tasman Sea, The Tasman: Biography of an Ocean. In 2013, Peat was elected to the Dunedin City Council, and served one term before standing down in 2016.

In 2004, Peat was behind moves to create an official flag for Otago. This culminated in a competition run through the auspices of the Otago Daily Times newspaper and Otago Polytechnic School of Art towards the end of that year.

Peat published over 40 titles including those on regional national history of New Zealand and on national birds such as the kiwi and New Zealand falcon.

Peat died in Dunedin Hospital on 1 March 2026, at the age of 78.

== Honours and awards ==
In 1994, Peat was named Dunedin Citizen of the Year, because of his books on the region and establishing the Dunedin Environmental Business Network. In 1996, he and co-author Brian Patrick won the Montana New Zealand Book Awards for the book Wild Dunedin. Peat was awarded the Creative New Zealand Michael King Writers' Fellowship, New Zealand's largest literary award, in 2007. In 2016, he received the CLNZ Writers' Award for his project The Invading Sea.

In the 2018 New Year Honours, Peat was appointed a Member of the New Zealand Order of Merit, for services to conservation. He received the Prime Minister's Award for Literary Achievement in 2024.
