= Ben Schrader =

New Zealand historian (1964–2024)

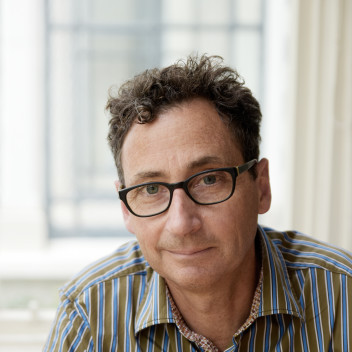
- Schrader in 2016
- Born: 19 July 1964; Christchurch, New Zealand
- Died: 19 April 2024 (aged 59); Wellington, New Zealand
- Occupation: Historian
- Spouse: Lis Cowey
- Children: 2
- Writing career
- Notable works: The Big Smoke: New Zealand Cities, 1840–1920 (2016)
- Notable awards: W.H. Oliver Prize (2016); CLNZ Writers' Award (2017)

Academic background
- Education: University of Melbourne
- Thesis: Rebuilding Melbourne: modernity and progress in the central business district, 1910–50 (2001)

Ben Schrader (19 July 1964 – 19 April 2024) was a New Zealand historian specialising in urban history. His areas of interest included the history of state housing in New Zealand and urban development in New Zealand in the 19th and 20th centuries.

== Education and personal life ==
Schrader was born in Christchurch in 1964, and grew up in Wellington where he attended Onslow College. He obtained a bachelor's degree in arts from Victoria University of Wellington in 1986 followed by a master's degree in 1993. Before obtaining his master's degree, Schrader married Lis Cowley; they had two sons together.

Schrader's master's thesis was titled Planning Happy Families: A History of the Naenae Idea, and it received the university's F.P. Wilson Prize. He spoke publicly about the importance of Naenae to New Zealand's urban planning history. In 2001, he completed his doctorate at the University of Melbourne; his thesis was titled Rebuilding Melbourne: modernity and progress in the central business district, 1910–50.

Schrader died in Wellington on 19 April 2024, at the age of 59.

== Career ==
Schrader was a contributor to the urban plates of the New Zealand Historical Atlas (1990–1997, edited by Malcolm McKinnon). He was the co-editor and co-author of the Economy and the City chapters of Te Ara: The Encyclopedia of New Zealand.

Schrader was a founding member of the Professional Historians' Association of New Zealand (PHANZA) in 1994, served on its first committee, and in 2023 was made a life member of the organisation. From 2015 onwards he served on the committee of Historic Places Wellington. In 2016 he was interviewed by Radio New Zealand about New Zealand's urban history.

In 2006, his book We Call It Home: a history of state housing in New Zealand (2005) was shortlisted for the history award at the Montana New Zealand Book Awards. The Waikato Times described the book as a "must-read book for all New Zealanders as it provides a valuable snapshot of an initiative we can be proud of". In 2015 journalist Chris Trotter cited the work in a discussion about the politics of state housing, and in 2024 Max Rashbrooke referred to it as an "excellent book" that was relevant to the Government's announcement of a "crackdown" on emergency housing.

In 2017, Schrader's book The Big Smoke: New Zealand Cities, 1840–1920 (2016) received the W.H. Oliver Prize, awarded by the New Zealand Historical Association. The award recognises the best book published in New Zealand history on the previous two years. The work also received the 2017 New Zealand Heritage Non-Fiction Book Award, and was shortlisted for the General Non-Fiction award at the 2017 Ockham New Zealand Book Awards.

A review of The Big Smoke in the Journal of New Zealand Studies said the work "makes a powerful case for the centrality of the urban in New Zealand’s evolving identity". Erik Olssen writing in the New Zealand Journal of History noted some "scholarly issues" with the text but said these should not detract from the "general reader's enjoyment"; he said the work "contained much fresh and original material, often enlivened by pertinent biographical essays, [and] deftly introduced the broader socio-cultural context".

In 2017, Schrader received the CLNZ Writers' Award, worth $25,000, towards work on his next research project. He was awarded the Athfield Cup by the Wellington branch of the New Zealand Institute of Architects in 2021; the cup is presented annually to a Wellingtonian who is not a practising architect for their contribution to the conservation of Wellington's architecture. Schrader held the 2022 JD Stout Fellowship at Victoria University of Wellington, during which his research work focused on the history of urban conservation in New Zealand.

=== Selected works ===
- We Call It Home: A History of State Housing in New Zealand (Reed Publishing, 2005)
- More than a Landlord: A Short history of Wellington Housing Trust (Wellington Housing Trust, 2006)
- The Big Smoke: New Zealand Cities, 1840–1920 (Bridget Williams Books, 2016)
