= The Whizz Kids =

Rock band in New Zealand

- Origin: Auckland, New Zealand
- Genres: Rock, pop
- Years active: 1980
- Labels: Ripper Records
- Past members: Andrew Snoid; Mark Bell; Tim Mahon; Ian Gilroy

The Whizz Kids was a New Zealand rock band featuring Andrew Snoid, Mark Bell, Tim Mahon, and Ian Gilroy, who had previously played together in the Plague. They released a 7" single titled "Occupational Hazard" on Ripper Records in 1980, with the B-side being "Reena" by the Spelling Mistakes.

== Discography ==
- "Occupational Hazard" (7") (1980), Ripper Records
