= Tom Doig =

New Zealand writer and journalist

- Born: April 17, 1979; Wellington, New Zealand
- Education: University of Melbourne
- Occupations: author, investigative journalist, editor
- Years active: 2000s–present
- Notable work: The Coal Face, Hazelwood, We Are All Preppers Now

Tom Doig (born 17 April 1979 in Wellington) is a New Zealand-Australian creative non-fiction author, investigative journalist and editor, today based in Brisbane, Queensland. He is the author of three nonfiction books, including The Coal Face – a co-winner of the Oral History Victoria Award – and the recipient of the 2023 Copyright Licensing New Zealand (CLNZ) and the New Zealand Society of Authors (NZSA) Te Puni Kaituhi O Aotearoa (PEN NZ Inc) Writers’ Award.

== Education and career ==
Doig has a PhD from the University of Melbourne and is a lecturer in Creative Writing at the University of Queensland.

Doig was editor of Voiceworks magazine from 2004 to 2006 and was co-director of the National Young Writers' Festival from 2006 to 2007. He has contributed to publications including The Conversation, The Big Issue, The Spinoff and New Matilda.

In 2020 he was a finalist for the Walkley Awards and the Ned Kelly Awards for Hazelwood, an account of the 2014 Hazelwood Power Station coal mine fire. The book's publication was delayed by one year due to court proceedings against the mine operator.

Doig was the commissioning editor for Living with The Climate Crisis: Voices from Aotearoa (Bridget Williams Books, 2021). Scribe acquired world rights for Doig's next work We Are All Preppers Now for which he also received the 2023 Copyright Licensing New Zealand (CLNZ) and the New Zealand Society of Authors (NZSA) Te Puni Kaituhi O Aotearoa (PEN NZ Inc) Writers’ Award to develop the manuscript.

== Publications ==
=== Nonfiction ===
- Moron to Moron: Two Men, Two Bikes, One Mongolian Misadventure, Allen and Unwin, 2013
- The Coal Face, Penguin, 2015
- Hazelwood, Penguin, 2019
