= Pop Mechanix =

New Zealand pop music band

Pop Mechanix is a New Zealand–based pop music band that played in New Zealand and Australia from 1979 to 1988. Their single "Jumping out a Window" reached number 87 of the all-time top 100 singles for APRA NZ, and number 12 in the all-time top 50 singles for The Press

Pop Mechanix was involved in a precedent-setting lawsuit. An Australian band, Popular Mechanics, sued WEA, the Pop Mechanix record label, over the use of their name in the Australia. Popular Mechanics won the case, forcing Pop Mechanix to change their name, first to NZ Pop, and then to Zoo. The band eventually returned to New Zealand, where they continued to work as Pop Mechanix.

== Lineup ==
- Kevin Emmett – Drums/Backing Vocals 1979–1986
- Paul (Ace) Mason – Guitar – 1979–1988
- Chris Moore – Guitar/Keyboards – 1979–1983
- Paul Scott – Bass/Vocals – 1979–88. Lead Vocals 1982–83
- Andrew Snoid (Mclennan) – Vocals – 1980–1981, 1985–1988
- Richard (Dick) Driver – Vocals 1979–80
- Brent Williams – Guitar – 1985–1987
- Mark Bell – Guitar – 1987–88
- Peter (Rooda) Warren – Drums 1987–88

== Releases ==
Pop Mechanix has a large, but sporadic discography. Starting with three classic and collectible 7-inch singles in 1980 and 1981 "Now/Radio Song"(Ripper Records), "Ritz/Brains Are Dumb/Talking" (RCA) & "Jumping out a Window/Way I Dance/Private Military"(on the XSF label XS001) before moving to Australia.

A further single "Texas/Cowboys" and the single "Holidays/Ritz", under the new band name NZpop were released before Snoid left the band. Under the new band name Zoo, the record label released the album Cowboys and Engines.

In 1983, the band returned to New Zealand, where Snoid rejoined them. Moore left Pop Mechanix and guitarist Brent Williams joined them. In 1985, their new label, Hit Singles, released a four-song EP Virginia Purple/Here She Comes Again/Eyes of Love/No Surprise, and a 7-inch single of "Here She Comes Again". The last single with this lineup was "Celebration of The Skin/Land of Broken Dreams", released in 1986.

The band signed to WEA records and recorded 4 songs with American Producer John Boylan who had worked on Sharon ONeill's material, but also worked with Country and soft rock bands like Air Supply. It was an awkward fit for the band. In 1988 they released one final single "Pale Sun/Alright Here" from these sessions with Peter Warren and Mark Bell added to the lineup. Pop Mechanix split after this release when told how much they owed to the record label for their dalliance with a high end producer.

In April 2005, Failsafe Records released five discs covering four phases of Pop Mechanix.

- Now – Singles and Demos 1979 – 1981 (SAFE067CD)
- Zoo – Lost in Australia – 1981 – 1983 (SAFE068CD)
- Acceptance – Reform Restart, Redirect – 1985 – 1986 (SAFE069CD)
- Alright Here – Make or Break – 1987 – 1988 (SAFE070CD)
- Live Kicks – Live Performance kicks 1985–1986 (SAFE071CD)

In March 2010, Failsafe released a compilation of the band's singles from the 1981–1986 period.

- Now:Then – One Hit Windows
- 2010 – Splash Alley – Lets Get Started 1979–80 captures the Richard Driver period of the band comprising one concert at Auckland's Mainstreet venue and Drivers version of the band's first single "Now".
- 2022Lost Tapes – Parallel Universe – 1982, containing the Australian album with Snoid's original vocals, recorded before he left the band to join the Swingers. Many of the tracks on this disc were re-sung by Bassist Paul Scott after Snoid's departure. Three previously unreleased tracks were not included on the Cowboys and Engines album.
