= Philip Dadson =

New Zealand musician and artist

- Born: 1946 (age 79–80); Napier, New Zealand
- Years active: 1968–present
- Labels: Atoll Records, Rattle Records, Flying Nun Records

Philip Dadson (born 1946 in Napier, New Zealand) ONZM is a New Zealand musician and artist, who was in the foundation group for the Scratch Orchestra and founder of From Scratch. He lectured at the Elam School of Fine Arts, part of the University of Auckland from 1977, leaving in 2001 to take up full-time art practice.

He co-authored the 2007 book Slap Tubes and other Plosive Aerophones with fellow instrument inventor Bart Hopkin, whose 1998 CD/book Gravikords, Whirlies & Pyrophones had also featured Dadson's group From Scratch.

In 2010 the Wellington Sculpture Trust commissioned Akau Tangi, a wind powered sculpture installed on Cobham Drive, Wellington. The eight poles, some partly submerged in the sea, are each topped with a rotating cone that produce a low level musical note. The rotating cones also have an internal light source powered by the wind driven rotating cones.

In 2015, a feature film documentary titled Sonicsfromscratch (dir. by Simon Ogston and Orlando Stewart), documenting Dadson's career, was premiered at the New Zealand International Film Festival.

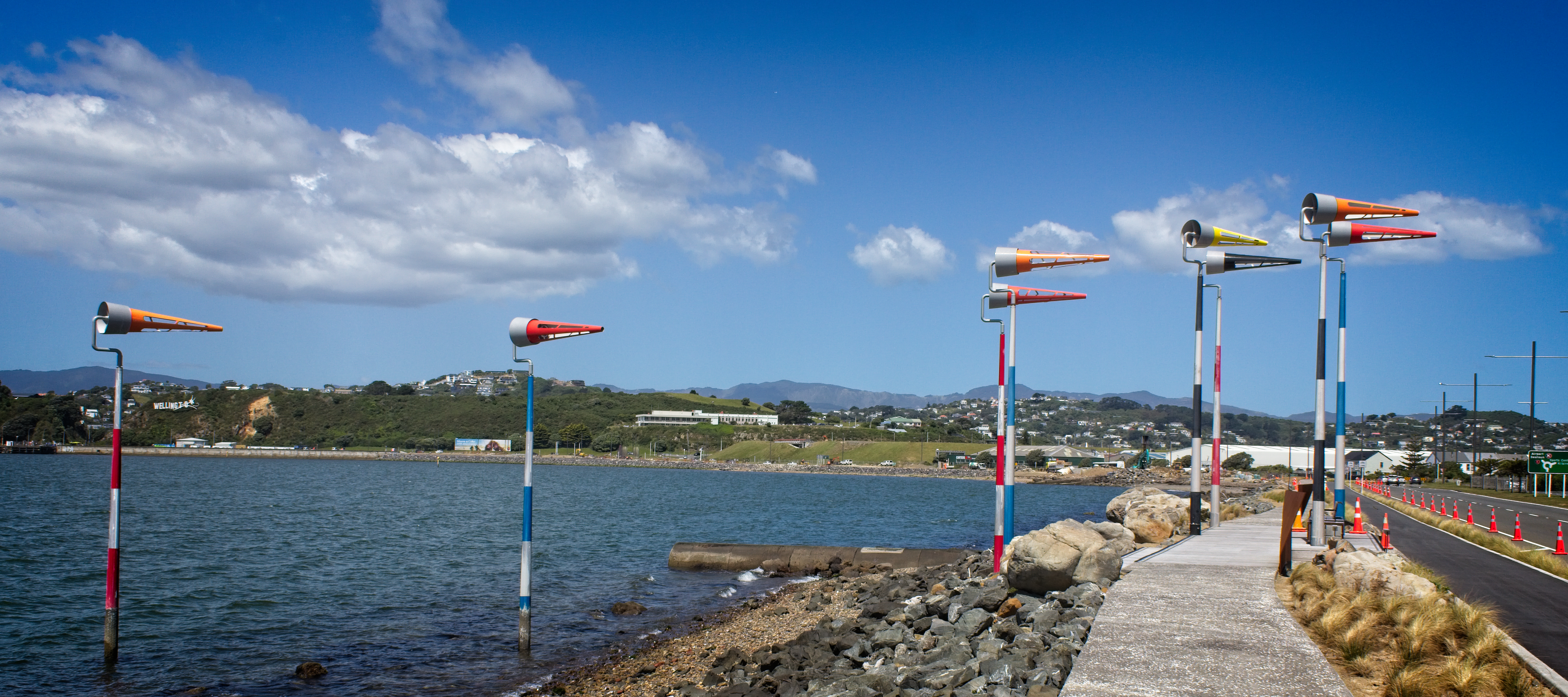
Aku Tangi, Phil Dadson, Cobam Drive, Wellington

== Education ==
Dadson is a Fine Arts graduate in sculpture from the Elam School of Fine Arts at the University of Auckland. He also obtained a Master of Arts with honours from Nepean, West Sydney University.

== Awards and honours ==
Dadson has received the following awards and honours

- 2001 Arts Foundation Laureate
- 2002-2003 New Zealand Antarctic Artist Fellowship
- 2005 New Zealand Order of Merit for services to art
- 2006 Fulbright-Wallace Arts Trust Award
