= From Scratch (band) =

New Zealand musical group

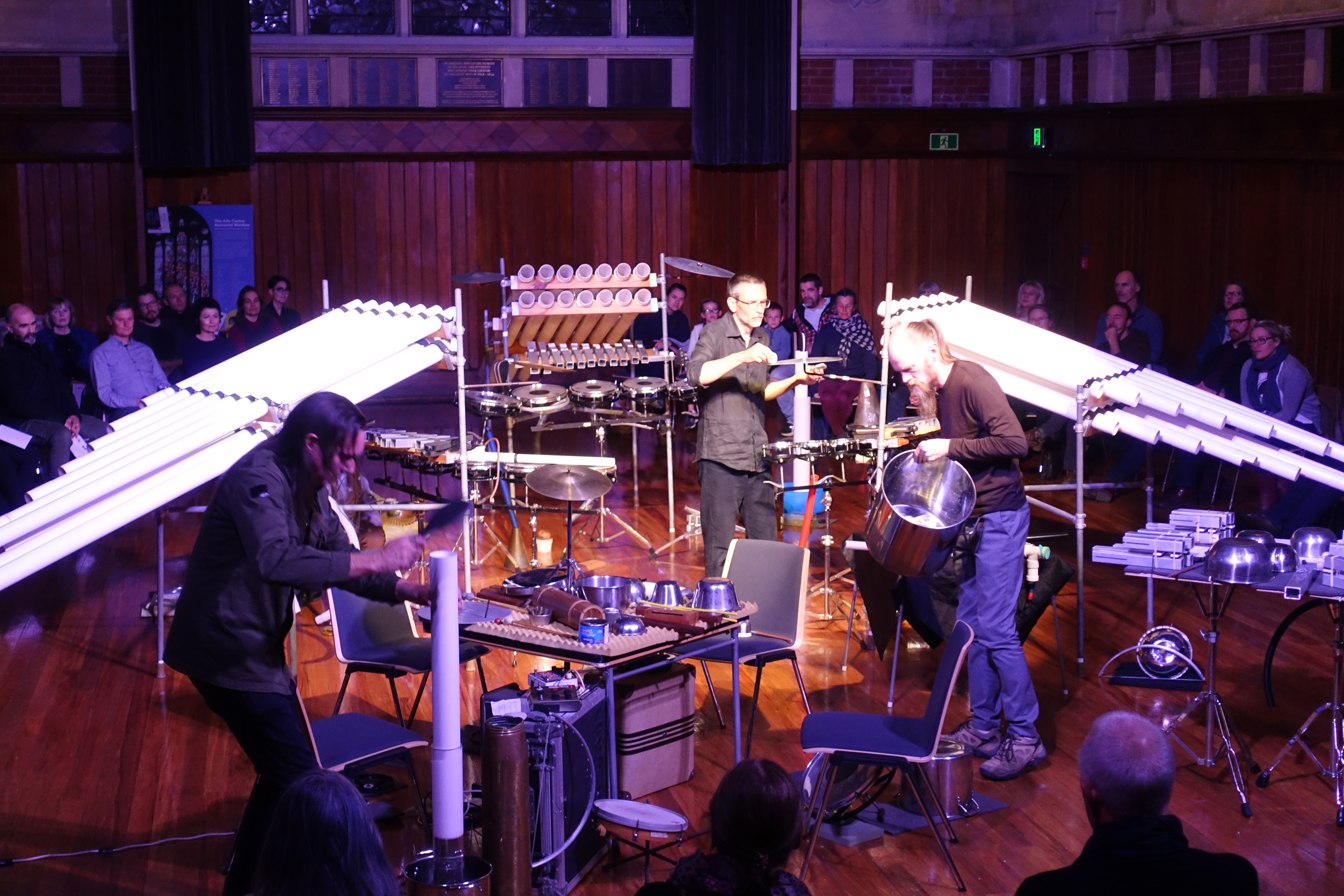
- From Scratch in 2020

Background information
- Origin: New Zealand
- Years active: 1974–present
- Labels: Hit Singles, Flying Nun Records, Kiwi Pacific, Atoll Records, EM Records, Audio Foundation Records
- Members: Philip Dadson; Shane Currey; Darryn Harkness; Adrian Croucher; Chris O'Connor
- Past members: Bruce Barber; Gray Nichol; Geoff Chapple; Don McGlashan; Wayne Laird; Neville Hall; Walter Muller; James McCarthy; Rachel Thomas; Rebecca Celebuski

From Scratch are a New Zealand experimental music / performance group, best known for their large sculptural invented instruments (primarily percussion), original music and hocket-style rhythmic innovation. They have performed since 1974 with an ever-changing lineup, though principally led by Philip Dadson.

== History ==
=== 1970s ===
From Scratch was formed in Auckland, New Zealand, in 1974 by Philip Dadson, along with other founding members Bruce Barber, Gray Nichol and Geoff Chapple. The group emerged from the NZ Scratch Orchestra (formed in 1970, also by Dadson, as an offshoot of Cornelius Cardew's original London-based Scratch Orchestra). The new From Scratch group sought to explore a more structured and rhythm-based approach than was possible with the Scratch Orchestra, whose large-scale, largely improvised performances had "often degenerated into therapeutic free-for-alls".

From Scratch's first performance was part of the Wellington Sonic Circus (1974), a mini-festival of new music, sound and art organised by Jack Body. They performed from a series of works titled "VOM" (Variable Occasion Music"), a manifesto providing "a flexible framework for rhythm, procedure and instrumentation, the variables for which are suggested by influences from the context or occasion in which the music is to be played".

The VOM works laid the groundwork for subsequent 1970s From Scratch rhythm-based compositions, including "Out-In" (1976), "Drumwheel" (1977) and "Triad #1" (1978), which was scored for two pianos, one played via a long rosined line attached to its interior. This produced harmonically rich continuous drone textures, which were also to become a feature of From Scratch performances.

By 1978 the group had also begun to perform using initial versions of the racks of long, horizontally mounted end-struck plastic pipes which would become their trademark instrument. Multiple sets of these "plosive aerophones" were typically used, struck with rubber paddles. They were inspired partly by seeing a Solomon Islands group performing with bamboo tube instruments at the 1976 South Pacific Festival of the Arts in Rotorua. The From Scratch versions were constructed from PVC drain pipe, beginning the group's association with sculptural instruments invented from industrial materials.

Towards the end of the 1970s the group had begun to perform internationally, presenting works at the Third Biennale of Sydney, Australia in 1979.

=== 1980–1986 ===
By the beginning of the 1980s Bruce Barber and Gray Nichol had left the group, to be replaced by Don McGlashan and Wayne Laird. This incarnation of From Scratch developed and performed some of the group's most iconic works, all featuring the PVC pipe instruments, but supplemented with racks of other instruments to form one-person "percussion stations" with a range of sound sources. These included rototom drums, metal chimes, tuned-tongue bamboos and aluminium gongs.

==== Gung Ho 1,2,3D ====
Their first major work of this period was "Gung Ho 1,2,3D" (1980), named after the slogan of the workers' co-operative movement established in China by New Zealander Rewi Alley (who was the subject of a book by From Scratch member Geoff Chapple). This slogan, meaning "work together", summarised From Scratch's commitment to egalitarian principles in music-making, expressed in an equal sharing of musical roles. Musically the piece explores a series of seven slowly evolving three-part polyrhythms, the first combining time signatures of length 3, 4, 5, the second 4, 5, 6, and so on up to 9, 10, 11 (with the fourth player taking on a drone role). This kind of polyrhythmic exploration had also featured in earlier works such as "Out In" and "Drumwheel", and would continue to be present in most later works by the group.

From Scratch previewed excerpts from "Gung Ho 1,2,3D" at the South Pacific Festival of the Arts in Port Moresby, Papua New Guinea in June 1980. According to Dadson, "It was just the most magical context to be in, because there were like fifty groups from all the outlying provinces of PNG that came into Port Moresby for the festival... we cart out our PVC pipes, do a quick setup, flail into something out of Gung Ho. And this is in the absolute heat of the noonday sun, broad brimmed hats on. It was so hot that all the pipes changed pitch, while the drums went flaccid. It went down okay with the locals. They just thought we were hilarious".

The visual interest of their performances began to attract the attention of film-makers, and "Gung Ho 1,2,3D" was filmed for New Zealand television in 1981. The entire work was also later pressed for a Flying Nun LP in 1988, but this was never released because the covers were damaged during production.

==== Pacific 3,2,1,Zero (Part 1) ====
In October 1982 From Scratch made its first trip to the Northern hemisphere, to perform "Gung Ho 1,2,3D" at the twelfth Paris Biennale. Here they also took the opportunity to present a new work, "Pacific 3,2,1,Zero", written as a protest against French nuclear weapons testing and waste dumping in the Pacific. Names of Pacific islands contaminated by nuclear tests are sung and shouted during the piece, which ends with an urgent polyrhythmic PVC pipe section, followed by the solemn tolling of aluminium bell-poles.

The group also performed "Pacific 3,2,1,Zero" outdoors in the Pompidou Centre plaza to bring their music and message to a wider audience. A large crowd gathered, unexpectedly prompting a French fire-eater, on whose turf the group had unwittingly trespassed, to wade in amongst the performers and threaten to incinerate them, together with their PVC pipes. On completing the piece they were able to negotiate a truce and alternated their act with that of the fire-eater from then on.

From Scratch later collaborated with film-maker Gregor Nicholas on a short film of "Pacific 3,2,1,Zero", which won the Grand Prix and first prize in its category at the 1994 Cannes/Midem Visual Music Awards.

==== Pacific 3,2,1,Zero (Part 2) ====
Returning to New Zealand after the 1982 French tour, Dadson began work on a follow-up piece to "Pacific 3,2,1,Zero", less of a protest and more an expression of hope, "dedicated to the emerging force of solidarity among the peoples of the Pacific". The piece is scored for an expanded twelve-person ensemble (six men and six women) including percussion, male and female vocals, saxophones and trombones. It was intended to follow directly after Part 1. The first performance of the complete work was not until 1986, at Auckland Girls' Grammar school, Shed 11 in Wellington and the sixth Sydney Biennale.

==== Drum/Sing ====
"Drum/Sing" (1984) was conceived as a collaboration between From Scratch (now a trio after the departure of Geoff Chapple) and film-maker Gregor Nicholas. The resulting 22-minute film screened on New Zealand television in 1985 and was also presented as a short film before screenings of a popular locally made feature film, The Quiet Earth, in New Zealand cinemas – "much to the surprise of audiences who had not expected an art-music film to precede their entertainment". However, the film went on to win a Blue Ribbon Award in the Film as Art category at the New York Film Festival, as well as Best Short Film at the New Zealand GOFTA Awards.

"Drum/Sing" was the first From Scratch piece to explore the use of sung vocals in combination with the percussion stations. It is structured in linked modules, and for live performances was extended with an extra vocal section. The piece uses hocketing to share rhythmic / melodic lines between the performers, a technique which would be further developed in later From Scratch compositions.

=== 1988–1994 ===
Between 1986 and 1988 From Scratch went into temporary recess, following the departure of both Don McGlashan and Wayne Laird. Walter Muller joined in 1988, and he and Dadson performed a piece called "Rhythmwheel" as a duo at the World Drum Festival in Brisbane. At the 1989 inaugural Sound/Watch Festival in Auckland, they performed "Songs for Unsung Heroes", an early version of "Songs for Heroes".

The following year From Scratch regrouped with new members Neville Hall (a saxophonist) and James McCarthy (a student of Dadson's at the University of Auckland Elam School of Fine Arts). New instrumentation was developed, including parade bass drums with short racks of small-diameter PVC pipes attached, "Tone-trees" (tree-like assemblages of percussion sound sources), and "Zitherums", long string instruments with polystyrene resonators, played percussively with sticks or slides, or bowed as drones.

==== Carhorn Hocket ====
"Carhorn Hocket" involves multiple car-horns (with cars still attached), and features door-slamming and engine revving, as well as horns. "Carhorn Hocket" was first performed with four cars on 6 February 1991 as part of a double-album launch party at Artspace in Auckland, celebrating the release of the From Scratch album "Songs for Heroes" and the Gitbox Rebellion album "Pesky Digits". Expanded to eight cars, it was performed as "Carhorn Hocket 2" in 1994 in Civic Square, Wellington as part of ExtravaCANZa, which was the 20th birthday of the Composers Association of NZ – on this occasion, performers included Gary Wilby, Mark Langford, Harry van Enckevort and Judith Exley. It was performed again (in the Auckland University quad and the Titirangi War Memorial Hall carpark) for the 273 Moons concerts in 1995 and in Jakarta in 1997 for the International Percussion Festival. It was later revived for the 2018 survey exhibition "555 Moons".

==== Songs for Heroes ====
One of the first works performed by the revitalised group was "Songs for Heroes" (1990), a tribute to "spiritual sages of all times and ages". Besides the newly developed instruments, soprano saxophone and pianohorns, the piece also makes use of vocal harmonics in its closing drone section.

==== Fax To Paris ====
"Fax To Paris" (1990) was a short piece protesting continued French nuclear testing in the Pacific, featuring shouted vocals, hand-clapping and tone-trees. Like "Songs for Heroes", it uses hocketed vocals using the syllables "ha" and "hey" which would become part of the group's trademark sound.

==== Eye/Drum ====
The 1992 piece "Eye/Drum" marked a departure from previous From Scratch works, being their first large-scale piece not to feature the classic large end-struck PVC-pipe instruments. These had been replaced by "Eye-drum" stations, made from shorter lengths of PVC pipe with hard plastic membranes at the playing end and playable with mallets. Other new instruments included hand-held found objects such as "Fingerpots" (small gourds played with hard thimbles attached to the fingers, featured also in the piece "Fingerpot Rag") and "Song-stones" (pairs of selected resonant stones).

==== The From Scratch Rhythm Workbook ====
In 1990 Philip Dadson and Don McGlashan published "The From Scratch Rhythm Workbook", a book containing a set of rhythm games and exercises distilled from the group's rhythmic experiments. It also included ideas for composition strategies, instrument building and documentation of the VOM manifesto. The book formed the basis for From Scratch rhythm workshops usually taught by Dadson. A second edition was published in 1995.

=== 1995–2002 ===
In the mid-1990s Walter Muller and Neville Hall left the group and were replaced by Shane Currey. For a short time From Scratch performed as a trio (Dadson, McCarthy and Currey) and performed in Japan and Thailand in 1995.

==== 273 Moons ====
Also in 1995, From Scratch marked its 21st birthday with a celebratory concert series called "273 Moons", held in Auckland at the Maidment Theatre and the Titirangi War Memorial Hall. The concerts featured a range of recent and past works, including one of the early VOM pieces from the 1970s, as well as works for larger ensembles of mixed vocals and brass instruments, and "Carhorn Hocket".

==== Global Hockets ====
The year 1996 saw further lineup changes, with James McCarthy being replaced by new members Darryn Harkness and Adrian Croucher. Dadson began to compose a new large-scale piece based largely around hocketing. An initial version of the piece, titled "Homage to the God of Hockets", was performed in 1997 at WOMAD in Auckland and in Indonesia (Denpasar, Bandung and the Jakarta Percussion Festival).

New instrumentation for the piece included reconfigured bass-drum percussion stations and the "Nunn-drum", a tribute to US instrument inventor Thomas Nunn. This consists of a bass drum shell with plywood heads and protruding threaded rods.

In its fully developed form the piece was a collaboration between From Scratch and German-based computer graphics artists "Supreme Particles". Titled "Global Hockets" partly to reflect this international collaboration, the multi-media work featured projected graphics which reacted in real time to the sound. Also, for the first time, From Scratch incorporated electronic sounds into their repertoire, with samples activated by MIDI triggers on some of the percussion instruments. "Global Hockets" included islands of improvised material in amongst tightly structured sections.

From Scratch premiered "Global Hockets" at the Wellington Arts Festival in early 1998, before touring the show in Hungary, Germany, Austria and the Netherlands throughout the remainder of the year.

==== Pacific Plate ====
After the "Global Hockets" European tour, Darryn Harkness left From Scratch and the group continued as a trio, developing a new piece called "Pacific Plate". Referencing volcanic and tectonic themes, it was described as "a tribute to the generally dormant, largely silent, seldom seen, and often forgotten forces, that have shaped the face of the planet over millennia".

The work again incorporated improvised sections bridging structured modules, and introduced more new instruments, including the "Water cooler drum kit", "Rod-Baschet" (named in tribute to the Baschet Brothers, with stroked glass rods activating a stainless steel resonator disc), Foley trays and "Gloop-drum" (a combination drum and string instrument, reminiscent of the ektara). Like "Global Hockets", the piece also included projected visuals, but of a much lower-tech variety (16mm film projected onto a Venetian blind). It ended with a chorus of whistling kettles and spinning ceramic plates.

"Pacific Plate" premiered in 2000 at the Taupō Arts Festival. It was also performed in Auckland and Wellington before being toured in Austria (Salzburg and Hall in Tirol) in 2001. The piece was also recorded and broadcast on Radio New Zealand in 2004, but the recording has as yet not been released.

=== 2014–2019 ===
After "Pacific Plate", From Scratch went into a long hiatus as members (including founder Philip Dadson) pursued other projects. There were no more hints of any possible renewal of group activity until 2014, when Dadson, Darryn Harkness and Adrian Croucher reunited for a single performance titled "Homage to the Philosophy of Lao Tse", a percussive improvisation structured around lines spoken from the Tao Te Ching. Although the From Scratch name was not used, the piece was recognisably in the vein of the group and sparked rumours of a revival.

==== Philip Dadson: Sonics From Scratch ====
In 2015 a feature-length documentary film, "Philip Dadson: Sonics From Scratch", was released about Philip Dadson, which necessarily also contained a lot of material on From Scratch, as the group had been an important part of his life and work. The film, directed by Simon Ogston and Orlando Stewart, premiered at the New Zealand International Film Festival on 25 July 2015. A number of past From Scratch members were present at the premiere, and the film (which screened on Air New Zealand flights for a time) helped revive interest in the group.

==== New CD releases ====
In 2016 the Japanese record label "EM Records" released a new From Scratch album titled "Five Rhythm Works", consisting of re-releases of four early works: "Out in Part 1", "Drumwheel Part 2", "Gung Ho 1,2,3D" (the 5,6,7 and 6,7,8 modules) and "Passage" (one of the VOM pieces).

EM Records released a second From Scratch album in 2017, this time containing the "8,9,10" and "9,10,11" modules from "Gung Ho 1,2,3D", together with re-interpretations of these pieces by other artists. A third album followed in 2018, containing one piece from each of the first three decades of the group: "Triad #1" (1978), "Drum/Sing" (1984) and "Fax To Paris" (1990).

Andrew Clifford, director of Te Uru Waitakere Contemporary Gallery, who had completed an MFA research project on From Scratch in 2013, said of the "Five Rhythm Works" album release, "It's important, because it has a lot to do with kick-starting the From Scratch revival after their long hiatus, although I'm sure the poking and prodding that I'd been doing in the preceding years also helped plant some seeds".

==== From Scratch Returns ====
To mark the New Zealand launch of the "Five Rhythm Works" album, a performance titled "From Scratch Returns" was held in Auckland on 6 May 2016. The two-and-a-half-hour improvised show had "accompanists" Dadson, Darryn Harkness and Adrian Croucher joined at pre-determined times by a series of guest performers, including fellow From Scratch alumni Geoff Chapple, Don McGlashan, Walter Muller, James McCarthy and Shane Currey.

==== 546 Moons / Heart'Heart ====
In 2017, From Scratch re-grouped in preparation for "546 Moons", a survey exhibition at Te Uru Waitakere Contemporary Gallery of instruments and memorabilia, curated by Andrew Clifford, together with a series of performances titled "Heart'Heart" in the 2018 Auckland Arts Festival.

The four members (Dadson, Croucher, Currey and Harkness) from the 1996 – 1998 incarnation of the group were joined by new members Rebecca Celebuski, Rachel Thomas and Chris O'Connor.

The show was based around "Global Hockets" (not previously performed in Auckland) but also contained performances of "Drumwheel" (with Carol Brown taking the central spinning dance role) and "POWWOW", a new piece for three end-struck PVC pipe stations (reminiscent of the finale of "Pacific 3,2,1,Zero"). In addition there were short collaborative works with Dan Beban and Nell Thomas from the group "Orchestra of Spheres", Chris O'Connor, Pitch Black, and the New Pacific Music Ensemble.

Several new instruments were also featured, including the "Rutman Cello" (a tribute instrument based on designs by Robert Rutman), "Sprongs", foot-pump operated "Fipple Whistles", "Wall Wires" (a long string instrument incorporating a bass drum and mounted into a wall) and "Tone Thrones" (a series of instruments based on chairs).

==== 555 Moons / Heart'Heart'Heart ====
From November 2018 to March 2019, City Gallery Wellington hosted "555 Moons", an updated version of the 546 Moons From Scratch survey exhibition. This included video and photographic documentation from the group's 2018 Auckland performances, as well as a gallery devoted to Pacific Plate, with video footage and an interactive Foley floor.

The exhibition was opened with a live performance of Carhorn Hocket in Civic Square outside the gallery. Other performance events followed, including "And Their Heads Are Turning" (the group's collaboration with Wellington-based "Orchestra of Spheres") in December 2018, and the 6-hour improvised "Visitors" show in February 2019, with invited Wellington musicians joining the group at pre-determined times.

The exhibition closed with Heart'Heart'Heart, a slightly shorter version of the 2018 Heart'Heart performance, including most of Global Hockets, POWWOW, Drumwheel and a slightly revised version of "Wobble Ova Oases", the group's collaboration with Chris O'Connor.

=== 2020 ===
==== Pax/Pacifica tour ====
In September 2020, From Scratch made a tour of New Zealand, with 14 performances mainly in the South Island and on Stewart Island / Rakiura, as most of the planned North Island dates had to be cancelled as a result of lockdowns associated with the COVID-19 pandemic.

The group presented a new work entitled "Pax/Pacifica", described as a "conch-call to the fallout of nuclear testing and climate change in the Pacific" and performed by Dadson, Croucher, Currey and Harkness. The piece used some of the group's more familiar instruments (song-stones, aluminium bells and their trademark long PVC pipe stations) together with new ones including "membrane horns" (end-blown PVC pipe instruments with a balloon membrane) and "glissflutes" (side-blown flutes with balloon membranes at both ends). It also incorporated a performance of the early polyrhythmic work "VOM6".

As well as "Pax/Pacifica" the tour programme featured a reprise of the 1982 work "Pacific 3,2,1,Zero" (Part 1), performed by Croucher, Currey and Harkness. The repertoire of island names sung and shouted during the piece was expanded to include islands at risk from or already affected by climate change, including Aotearoa itself.

=== 2024 ===
==== 625 Moons ====
In September 2024 From Scratch celebrated its 50th anniversary with a month-long residency and festival, titled "625 Moons", at the Audio Foundation in Auckland. This included an exhibition of instruments, video and posters, together with a series of performances, many in collaboration with other musicians and artists.

For the opening event, a performance of the early From Scratch piece "Passage (VOM8)" preceded a concert of works presented by the percussionist Justin de Hart, including the commissioned work "Kōrero Kōhatu - A Conversation With Stones" composed by Phil Dadson.

The concerts throughout the month also included collaborations with Karl Sölve Steven, Eve de Castro-Robinson, Eric Renick, Salvador Brown, Thomas Carroll, Chris O'Connor, Drew McMillan, Jeff Henderson and the New Telepathics.

A film night presented a series of short films by Gregory Bennett, Philip Dadson, Michael Saup, Teresa Peters, Florian Habicht, Richard von Sturmer and Gabriel White, with live sound accompaniment by From Scratch together with James McCarthy, Tim Sutton, Anita Clark, Rosie Langabeer, Paul Buckton, Richard Francis, Jeff Henderson, Peter Scholes, Kevin Kim and Neil Feather.

The finale performance included a reprise of the From Scratch piece "Tok Tok", for percussion stations, aluminium bell-poles and vocals, originally performed as a duo by Dadson and James McCarthy in the early 1990s. Shane Currey developed expanded sets of hand-held bell-pole instruments, dubbed "Aerial Bells" because of their distinctive shape, and composed a new piece titled "Five to the Power of Four" (a reference to the 625 lunar cycles since the group's first performance in 1974) which was also featured in the finale.

Selected recordings from the 625 Moons performances were released on LP in 2025.

== Releases ==
=== Recordings ===
- From Scratch Perform Rhythm Works

12" LP, 1979, Private Release, PRA 905
Side One: Out-In Pt 1 & 2
Side Two: Drumwheel Pt 1 & 2
Performed by Geoff Chapple, Philip Dadson, Wayne Laird, Don McGlashan, Gary Wain
Sound engineer: David Hurley; recorded at Mandrill Studios, Auckland

- 3 Pieces from Gung Ho 1,2,3D

12" EP, 1983, Hit Singles, HITM004
Side One: 8-9-10 (sixth module) (10'00")
Side Two: 5-6-7 (third module) & 6-7-8 (fourth, central module) (10'20")
Instruments: tuned PVC pipes, metal chimes, drums, spun drones
Devised by Phil Dadson
Performed by Geoff Chapple, Philip Dadson, Wayne Laird, Don McGlashan
Sound Engineer: Greg Brice

- Pacific 3,2,1,Zero (part 1) and Drum/Sing

LP, 1985, Flying Nun, FN041
Side One: Pacific 3,2,1,Zero (Part One) (23')
Side Two: Drum/Sing (26')
Instruments: tuned PVC pipes, chimes, bamboos, drums, handbells, Jilzira drones, cymbals, voices, trom tubes, spun drones, rattle jackets, biscuit tins
Performed by Philip Dadson, Wayne Laird, Don McGlashan
Engineered by Steve Garden at The Valley Conference Centre, Albany; mixed at Progressive Studios, Auckland, July 1985
Also self-released on cassette in 1984

- Gung Ho 1,2,3D LP

LP, 1988, Flying Nun, FN085
Side One: 3,4,5; 4,5,6; 5,6,7; 6,7,8; 7,8,9 (23'30")
Side Two: 8,9,10; 9,10,11 (24'30")
Instruments: tuned PVC pipes, metal chimes, drums, spun drones
Devised by Phil Dadson
Performed by Geoff Chapple, Philip Dadson, Wayne Laird, Don McGlashan
Sound Engineer: Greg Brice; Remixed in 1987 by Greg Brice and Wayne Laird at Wayne Laird's studio
This is a full-length re-release and remix of the earlier Hit Singles 12".

- Songs For Heroes

CD, Cassette, 1991, Rattle Records RAT D002 or RAT C002
A continuous piece of music in eight sections
Devised by Philip Dadson
Performed by Philip Dadson, Neville Hall, James McCarthy, Walter Muller
A tribute to unsung heroes, past and present
This was remastered and reissued with new artwork in 2011

- Pacific 3,2,1,Zero (part one) and Eye/Drum

New digital release of Pacific 3,2,1,Zero with a new work, Eye/Drum
CD, cassette, 1994, Kiwi-Pacific International, CD SLC-236 or TC SLC-236
Pacific 3,1,1,Zero devised by Philip Dadson, Wayne Laird, Don McGlashan; performed by Philip Dadson, Wayne Laird, James McCarthy
Eye/Drum devised by Phil Dadson; performed by Philip Dadson, Neville Hall, James McCarthy, Walter Muller

- Global Hockets – From Scratch Live in Europe with Supreme Particles

CD, 1999, Scratch Records
Devised by Philip Dadson
Performed by Adrian Croucher, Shane Currey, Phil Dadson, Darryn Harkness
Also self-released on cassette in 1998 and VHS in 2000

- Pacific 3,2,1,Zero Parts 1 and 2 Live

CD, 1986, Atoll Ltd, ACD 301
Part 1 devised by Philip Dadson
Part 2 devised by Philip Dadson
Part 2 performed by Geoff Chapple, Philip Dadson, Wayne Laird, Joshna LaTrobe, Dipali Linwood, Niki May, Don McGlashan, Peter Scholes, Kim Wesney
Produced by Wayne Laird
Also self-released on cassette in 1986

- Five Rhythm Works

CD and LP, 2016, EM Records, EM1150CD or EM1150LP
Out in Part 1 (1976), Drumwheel Part 2 (1977), 5,6,7 and 6,7,8 from Gung Ho 1,2,3D (1979), Passage (1974)
Composed by Philip Dadson

- 8,9,10 and 9,10,11 from Gung Ho 1,2,3D

CD and double LP, 2017, EM Records, EM1160CD or EM1160DLP
Performed by From Scratch (1981), plus interpretations by Goat, Don't DJ and Utena Kobayashi Group
Composed by Philip Dadson

- Triad #1 – Drum/Sing – Fax To Paris

CD and LP, 2018, EM Records, EMC-007
Triad #1 (1978) for two pianos, performed by Philip Dadson and Gray Nichol
Drum/Sing (1984) and Fax To Paris (1990), performed by From Scratch
Composed by Philip Dadson

- 625 Moons

LP and download, 2025, Audio Foundation Records, AFRLP04
Vascular Cambium (with Andrew McMillan), Te Wā (with Rāhana Tito-Taylor and Parks), Timepiece for Janus (with Eric Renick), Five to the Power of Four, Co-operation (with Karl Sölve Steven), Black Moon (with Richard Francis and Anita Clark), Dei Secchi, Dei Bagnati (with Peter Scholes and Jeff Henderson), Scratch My Arts (with Jeff Henderson), With Fish Thought Extinct

=== Compilations ===
- From the Pages of Experimental Musical Instruments Volume VI

Cassette, Experimental Musical Instruments (US), 1991
From Scratch contribute excerpts from Songs for Heroes

- Different Tracks

CD, Cassette, 1993, Rattle Records RAT D003
Instruments: hocketed handclapping, vocal chant and tone-tree percussion of gongs and cymbals
Devised by Philip Dadson
Performed by Philip Dadson, Neville Hall, James McCarthy, Walter Muller
From Scratch contributes Fax To Paris

- Gravikords, Whirlies, and Pyrophones

Compilation CD, Ellipsis Arts CD3630, 1998
Produced by Bart Hopkin of Experimental Musical Instruments magazine
Introduction by Tom Waits
Contains a 96 page colour book and 73 minute CD
From Scratch contributes an excerpt of Pacific 3-2-1-Zero (1986)

=== Films ===
- Drum/Sing

16mm film, VHS PAL or NTSC (20 minutes)
A collaboration with Director Gregor Nicholas
Award Winning Film

- Pacific 3,2,1,Zero

VHS, 1993 (21 minutes)
A collaboration with Director Gregor Nicholas
Awarded Grand Prix, Cannes/Midem 1994

- Global Hockets: Supreme Particles From Scratch – Live at New Zealand's Festival of the Arts

VHS, Scratch Records, 2000
Recorded in Wellington, New Zealand, 1998
A one-hour video documentary with stereo sound

- Philip Dadson: Sonics From Scratch

Feature-length documentary (85 minutes), 2015
Dir. Simon Ogston, Orlando Stewart
Premiered at NZ International Film Festival, 25 July 2015, Auckland

=== Publications ===
- The From Scratch Rhythm Workbook

ISBN 978-0-435-08670-1, 1995, 102 page in spiral binding
By Don McGlashan, Philip Dadson, University of Auckland, New Zealand
Published by Heinemann Drama
A workbook for Grade K8 and up students that introduces new musical ideas of body-based rhythm and sound, compositional concepts for solo or group participation.

- Slap tubes and other plosive aerophones: the greatest music-making idea that most people have never heard of

ISBN 978-0972731348, 2007, 64 pages, comes with CD
By Bart Hopkin and Philip Dadson
Published by Experimental Musical Instruments, Pt Reyes Station, CA

- Splash Five 1987: From Scratch Special Issue 2018

ISBN 978-0473439187, 2018, 131pp, A4, comes with poster insert
By Wystan Curnow and From Scratch
Published by Small Bore Books, Whanganui
The lost special issue of Splash magazine, dedicated to From Scratch and belatedly published in 2018, accompanied by:

- From Scratch: 546 Moons

ISBN 978-0473439545, 2018, A1 fold-out poster/publication
By Andrew Clifford
Published by Te Uru Waitakere Contemporary Gallery, Auckland
A special insert to accompany Splash Five and updates the story from 1987–2018.
