= Coconut Rough =

New Zealand band

- Origin: New Zealand
- Genres: Pop, new wave
- Years active: 1982–1984
- Label: Mushroom Records
- Past members: Andrew Snoid; Mark Bell; Dennis "Choc" Te Whare; Stuart Pearce; Paul Hewitt; Bones Hillman

Coconut Rough were a short-lived New Zealand pop/new wave band formed in 1982.

Despite their 1983 first single, "Sierra Leone", hitting the top five, and the band being named Most Promising Group of the Year at that year's RIANZ Awards they split up in 1984.

== History ==
The band was formed in 1982 by lead singer Andrew Snoid, formerly with New Zealand bands the Whizz Kids, Pop Mechanix and Australian-based New Zealand group the Swingers, and guitarist Mark Bell. Bell later joined Snoid in a reformed Pop Mechanix. Other member were bassist Dennis "Choc" Te Whare, keyboardist Stuart Pearce and drummer Paul Hewitt, and later bassist Bones Hillman. They decided on the name "Coconut Rough" based on a type of sweet treat popular in Australia and New Zealand.

The band's biggest hit was also their first single. "Sierra Leone" reached number five in the 1983 New Zealand charts. The song was aided by one of the first New Zealand music videos with special effects. In 2001, Sierra Leone was voted the 94th-best New Zealand song of all time by members of APRA.

They were an opening act for The Police at their Western Springs concert in 1984, but had folded before the end of that year.

== Discography ==
=== Albums ===
List of albums, with selected chart positions
Title	Extended play details	Peak chart positions
Title	Extended play details	NZ
Whistle While You Work (with The Narcs)	Released: November 1983; Format: LP, CS; Label: CBD (SBP 237 956); Note: Live album	17
Coconut Rough	Released: 1984; Format: LP; Label: Mushroom (L 38216)	—

=== Singles ===
List of singles, with selected chart positions
Title	Year	Peak chart positions		Album
Title	Year	NZ	AUS	Album
"Sierra Leone"	1983	5	99	Coconut Rough
"As Good As It Gets"	1983	28	—	Coconut Rough
"Magic Hour"	1984	—	—	Coconut Rough
"Leisure Time"	1984	—	—	Coconut Rough

== Awards ==
Awards	Year	Category	Details	Result
RIANZ	1983	Single of the Year	"Sierra Leone"	Nominated
RIANZ	1983	Most Promising Group		Won
RIANZ	1983	Best Music Video	Greg Rood – "Sierra Leone"	Nominated
