= The Swingers =

New Zealand rock band

- Origin: Auckland, New Zealand
- Genres: Rock, new wave
- Years active: 1979–1982
- Labels: Ripper, Mushroom
- Past members: Phil Judd; Wayne Stevens; Mark Hough; Ian Gilroy; Andrew Snoid

The Swingers were a New Zealand rock band who were together from 1979 to 1982 and whose biggest single was the song "Counting the Beat".

== Background ==
Formed out of the remnants of the Suburban Reptiles, the founding members were Split Enz co-founder Phil Judd (guitar, vocals), Wayne Stevens (a.k.a. Bones Hillman) (bass), and Mark Hough (a.k.a. Buster Stiggs) (drums). Formed in 1979, the band released the single "One Good Reason", which was a top 20 hit in New Zealand. They also appeared on the Ripper Records sampler AK79 and established a large live following after a residency at Auckland's Liberty Stage club.

In 1980 the band moved to Australia and signed to Mushroom Records for that country, although their New Zealand releases remained on Ripper.

== Success ==
After some band dissension, Ian Gilroy of the Crocodiles replaced Hough on drums. The band released the single "Counting the Beat", which became a No. 1 hit in Australia and New Zealand. A second single released in 1981, "It Ain't What You Dance, It's the Way That You Dance It" (which had the outro repeat line "oh yeah, oh yeah, oh yeah yeah yeah yeah yeah"), was also a top 5 hit in New Zealand but only a minor hit in Australia (reaching No. 43). An album, Practical Jokers, produced by David Tickle, was released in 1981. The band performed a number of songs in the 1982 film Starstruck, which were also featured on the soundtrack album. The soundtrack album peaked at No. 13 on the Australian Album charts.

== Breakup ==
The band underwent a couple more line-up changes, including the addition of Pop Mechanix and Coconut Rough vocalist Andrew Snoid, before it split up in March 1982. Phil Judd went on to pursue a solo career.

== Discography ==
=== Albums ===
Title	Details	Peak chart positions	
Title	Details	NZ	AUS
Practical Jokers	Released: September 1981; Label: Ripper, Mushroom; Formats: CD, LP	2	70

=== Singles ===
Title	Year	Peak chart positions		Album
Title	Year	NZ	AUS	Album
"One Good Reason"	1979	19	—	non-album single
"Counting the Beat"	1981	1	1	Practical Jokers
"It Ain't What You Dance, It's The Way That You Dance It"	1981	4	43	Practical Jokers
"One Track Mind"	1981	27	—	Practical Jokers
"Punch and Judy"	1982	—	—	non-album single
"—" denotes releases that did not chart or were not released.
