= Tim Mahon =

New Zealand musician

Tim Mahon is a New Zealand musician who played in the Plague, the Whizz Kids and Blam Blam Blam. He was seriously injured in a road accident while on tour with Blam Blam Blam, leading to the band breaking up.

In 1983 he played bass and sang with Avant Garage and wrote an album track, "Breakin-it-up", which is on both the LP and cassette. Other musicians involved in Avant Garage included Ivan Zagni and Peter Scholes.

His solo album, Music From a Lightbulb (2003) for which he used the name The Moth, was written with Peter Van Gent. Musicians playing on the album included Mark Bell, Ivan Zagni and Don McGlashan.

Tim was associated with the Otara Music Arts Centre as a council liaison. He was instrumental in forming bands such as Sistermatic (featuring Sina) and most notably the Otara Millionaires Club, e.g. on the Proud compilation created together with producer Alan Jansson. A later incarnation of the Otara Millionaires Club now named OMC had a worldwide hit with their song How Bizarre. In the 1990s he managed New Zealand girl group Ma-V-Elle. Rolling Stone described Mahon's role in enabling this music as being a 'white midwife for this new black music.'.

He now sells real estate in Auckland.

He currently plays bass in the band the Soul Agents, who include Blam Blam Blam member Mark Bell, he raises money for the Starship Foundation. This is a charity which supports Starship Children's Health in Auckland.

== Discography ==
=== Albums ===
Year	Title	Details	Peak chart positions
Year	Title	Details	NZ
2003	Music From a Lightbulb	Released as The Moth; Label: Birthday Music; Catalogue: FP038	—
"—" denotes a recording that did not chart or was not released in that territory.

==== With The Whizz Kids ====
- "Occupational Hazard" 7" (1980) Ripper Records

==== With Blam Blam Blam ====
- Luxury Length (1982) Propeller/Festival Records

==== With Avant Garage ====
- Garage To Gallery, 1983. Cassette, Avant Garage [no cat no.]
- Avant Garage music, 1983. LP, Unsung Music (UN11)

==== With Dead Sea Scrolls ====
- Dead Sea Scrolls, 1986, EP 12", Jayrem, JAY 136
