= Mark Bell (New Zealand musician) =

New Zealand musician and songwriter

Mark Bell is a New Zealand musician and songwriter. He has played in bands such as The Plague, The Whizz Kids, Blam Blam Blam, Coconut Rough and Ivan Zagni's Big Sideways. He currently works as a session musician in New Zealand. He is a member of Jordan Luck's band Luck.

He writes articles for NZ Musician magazine.

== Discography ==
=== Blam Blam Blam ===
- Maids To Order, 1981, EP, 12", Propeller, REV 10
- There Is No Depression in New Zealand, 1981, 7", Propeller, K8422 REV 11
- Luxury Length, 1982, LP, Propeller Records, (Rev 204)
- Blam Blam Blam, 1992, CD, Propeller, D11319 (Rev 28)
- The Complete Blam Blam Blam, 1992, CD, Propeller, D 30899 (REV 502)
- The Complete Blam Blam Blam, 2003, CD, Festival Mushroom, BBB2003

=== Big Sideways ===
- Big Sideways, 1982, LP, Unsung Music, Unsung 2

=== Coconut Rough ===
- Coconut Rough, Mushroom, 1984.

=== Ted Brown and The Italians ===
- If Ever You Need, Pagan, 1993. (cassette)

=== Whizz Kids ===
- Whizz Kids/Spelling Mistakes, Occupational Hazard, 1980, single, Ripper Records, RIP 004
  - Tracks:
    - Whizz Kids: "Occupational Hazard"
    - Spelling Mistakes: "Reena"

=== Sessions ===
- Blue Water, Debbie Harwood & Johnny Bongo, Pagan, 1987.
- It’s My Sin, Jan Hellriegel, Eastwest, 1992.
- "The Way I feel"/"All The Best Thoughts", Jan Hellriegel, Eastwest, 1992. (cassette)
- "It's My Sin"/"Stupidest Thing", Jan Hellriegel, Warner Music New Zealand, 1993. (cassette)
- Chinese Whispers, Greg Johnson, EMI, 1997.
- Sea Breeze Motel, Greg Johnson, EMI, 2000.
- Same Boy, Wayne Mason, Jayrem Records, 2001.
- Everest, Rikki Morris, Criminal Records, 1996.
- Music From A Lightbulb, The Moth (Tim Mahon), Distributed by Global Routes, c2002.
- Love By Satellite, David Parker, Lunacy Records, 1994. CD
- Love Explodes, Straw People, Pagan, 1993.

== Sources ==
- National Library of New Zealand Catalogue
- MySpace.com – Ted Brown
